Ibn Taymiyyah (January 22, 1263 – September 26, 1328), birth name Taqī ad-Dīn ʾAḥmad ibn ʿAbd al-Ḥalīm ibn ʿAbd al-Salām al-Numayrī al-Ḥarrānī, was a Sunni Muslim ʿĀlim, muhaddith, judge, proto-Salafist theologian, and sometimes controversial thinker and political figure. He is known for his diplomatic involvement with the Ilkhanid ruler Ghazan Khan and for his involvement at the Battle of Marj al-Saffar which ended the Mongol invasions of the Levant. A member of the Hanbali school, Ibn Taymiyyah's iconoclastic views that condemned numerous folk practices associated with saint veneration and the visitation of tomb-shrines made him unpopular with many scholars and rulers of the time, and he was imprisoned several times.

A polarising figure in his own times and in the centuries that followed, Ibn Taymiyyah has emerged as one of the most influential medieval writers in late modern Sunni Islam. He was also noteworthy for engaging in intense religious polemics that defended Athari school against the followers of rival schools of Kalam (speculative theology); namely Ash'arism and Maturidism. This would prompt numerous clerics and state authorities to accuse Ibn Taymiyyah and his disciples of being guilty of "tashbīh" (anthropomorphism); which eventually led to the censoring of his works and subsequent incarceration. Nevertheless, Ibn Taymiyya's numerous treatises that advocated "creedal Salafism" (al-salafiyya al-iʿtiqādīyya), based on his particular interpretations of the Qur'an and the Sunnah, constitute the most popular classical reference for later Salafi movements. 

Ibn Taymiyya's rejection of some aspects of classical Islamic tradition are believed to have had considerable influence on today's militant Islamist movements such as Salafi-Jihadism. Major aspects of his teachings such as upholding the pristine monotheism of the early Muslim generations and campaigns to uproot what he regarded as shirk (idolatry); had a profound influence on Muhammad ibn Abd al-Wahhab, the founder of the Hanbali reform movement practiced in Saudi Arabia, and on other later Sunni scholars. Syrian Salafi theologian Muhammad Rashid Rida (d. 1935 C.E/ 1354 A.H), one of the major modern proponents of his works, designated Ibn Taymiyya as the Mujaddid (renewer) of the Islamic 7th century of Hijri year. Ibn Taymiyyah's doctrinal positions on the necessity of an Islamic political entity and his controversial fatwas, such as his Takfir (declaration of unbelief) of the Mongol Ilkhanates, allowing jihad against other self-professed Muslims, are referenced by al-Qaeda and other jihadist groups to justify militant overthrowal of contemporary governments of the Muslim world.

Name 
Ibn Taymiyyah's full name is 'Taqiy al-Din 'Abu al-Abbas 'Aḥmad ibn ʿAbd al-Ḥalīm ibn ʿAbd as-Salām ibn ʿAbdullāh ibn al-Khiḍr ibn Muḥammad ibn al-Khiḍr ibn ʾIbrāhīm ibn ʿAli ibn ʿAbdullāh an-Numayrī al-Ḥarrānī.

Ibn Taymiyyah's name is unusual in that it is derived from a female member of his family as opposed to a male member, which was the normal custom at the time and still is now. The title "Taymiyyah" comes from the mother of his forefathers who was called Taymiyahh. She was an admonisher and he was ascribed to her and became known through the name, "Ibn Taymiyahh". Taymiyyah was a prominent woman, famous for her scholarship and piety and the name Ibn Taymiyyah was taken up by many of her male descendants.

Overview 
Ibn Taymiyyah had a simple life, most of which he dedicated to learning, writing, and teaching. He never married nor did he have a female companion throughout his years. Al-Matroudi says that this may be why he was able to engage fully with the political affairs of his time without holding any official position such as that of a judge. An offer of an official position was made to him but he never accepted. His life was that of a religious scholar and a political activist. In his efforts he was persecuted and imprisoned on six occasions with the total time spent inside prison coming to over six years. Other sources say that he spent over twelve years in prison. His detentions were due to certain elements of his creed and his views on some jurisprudential issues. However, according to Yahya Michot, "the real reasons were more trivial". Michot gives five reasons as to why Ibn Taymiyyah was imprisoned, they being: not complying with the "doctrines and practices prevalent among powerful religious and Sufi establishments, an overly outspoken personality, the jealousy of his peers, the risk to public order due to this popular appeal and political intrigues." Baber Johansen, a professor at the Harvard Divinity School, says that the reasons for Ibn Taymiyyah's incarcerations were, "as a result of his conflicts with Muslim mystics, jurists, and theologians, who were able to persuade the political authorities of the necessity to limit Ibn Taymiyyah's range of action through political censorship and incarceration."

Ibn Taymiyyah's own relationship, as a religious scholar, with the ruling apparatus was not always amicable. It ranged from silence to open rebellion. On occasions when he shared the same views and aims as the ruling authorities his contributions were welcomed, but when Ibn Taymiyyah went against the status quo, he was seen as "uncooperative", and on occasions spent much time in prison. Ibn Taymiyyah's attitude towards his own rulers was based on the actions of Muhammad's companions when they made an oath of allegiance to him as follows; "to obey within obedience to God, even if the one giving the order is unjust; to abstain from disputing the authority of those who exert it; and to speak out the truth, or take up its cause without fear in respect of God, of blame from anyone."

Early years

Family 
Ibn Taymiyyah's father had the Hanbali chair in Harran and later at the Umayyad Mosque. Harran was a city part of the Sultanate of Rum, now Harran is a small city on the border of Syria and Turkey, currently in Şanlıurfa Province. At the beginning of the Islamic period, Harran was located in the land of the Mudar tribe (Diyar Mudar). Before its destruction by the Mongols, Harran was also well known since the early days of Islam for its Hanbali school and tradition, to which Ibn Taymiyyah's family belonged. His grandfather, Abu al-Barkat Majd ad-Din ibn Taymiyyah al-Hanbali (d. 1255) and his uncle, Fakhr al-Din (d. 1225) were reputable scholars of the Hanbali school of law. Likewise, the scholarly achievements of his father, Shihab al-Din Abd al-Halim ibn Taymiyyah (d. 1284) were also well known.

Education 
In 1269, aged seven, Ibn Taymiyyah, left Harran together with his father and three brothers. The city was completely destroyed by the ensuing Mongol invasion. Ibn Taymiyyah's family moved and settled in Damascus, Syria, which at the time was ruled by the Mamluk Sultanate.

In Damascus, his father served as the director of the Sukkariyya Madrasa, a place where Ibn Taymiyyah also received his early education. Ibn Taymiyyah acquainted himself with the religious and secular sciences of his time. His religious studies began in his early teens, when he committed the entire Qur'an to memory and later on came to learn the Islamic disciplines of the Qur'an. From his father he learnt the religious science of fiqh (jurisprudence) and usul al-fiqh (principles of jurisprudence). Ibn Taymiyyah learnt the works of Ahmad ibn Hanbal, al-Khallal, Ibn Qudamah and also the works of his grandfather, Abu al-Barakat Majd ad-Din. His study of jurisprudence was not limited to the Hanbali tradition but he also learnt the other schools of jurisprudence.

The number of scholars under which he studied hadith is said to number more than two hundred, four of whom were women. Those who are known by name amount to forty hadith teachers, as recorded by Ibn Taymiyyah in his book called Arba`un Hadithan. Serajul Haque says, based on this, Ibn Taymiyyah started to hear hadith from the age of five. One of his teachers was the first Hanbali Chief Justice of Syria, Shams ud-Din Al-Maqdisi who held the newly created position instituted by Baibars as part of a reform of the judiciary. Al-Maqdisi later on, came to give Ibn Taymiyyah permission to issue Fatawa (legal verdicts) when he became a mufti at the age of 17.

Ibn Taymiyyah's secular studies led him to devote attention to Arabic language and Arabic literature by studying Arabic grammar and lexicography under Ali ibn `Abd al-Qawi al-Tufi. He went on to master the famous book of Arabic grammar, Al-Kitab, by the Persian grammarian Sibawayhi. He also studied mathematics, algebra, calligraphy, theology (kalam), philosophy, history and heresiography. Based on the knowledge he gained from history and philosophy, he used to refute the prevalent philosophical discourses of his time, one of which was Aristotelian philosophy. Ibn Taymiyyah learnt about Sufism and stated that he had reflected on the works of; Sahl al-Tustari, Junayd of Baghdad, Abu Talib al-Makki, Abdul-Qadir Gilani, Abu Hafs Umar al-Suhrawardi and Ibn Arabi. At the age of 20 in the year 1282, Ibn Taymiyyah completed his education.

Life as a scholar 

After his father died in 1284, he took up the then vacant post as the head of the Sukkariyya madrasa and began giving lessons on Hadith. A year later he started giving lessons, as chair of the Hanbali Zawiya on Fridays at the Umayyad Mosque, on the subject of tafsir (exegesis of Qur'an). In November 1292, Ibn Taymiyyah performed the Hajj and after returning 4 months later, he wrote his first book aged twenty nine called Manasik al-Hajj (Rites of the Pilgrimage), in which he criticized and condemned the religious innovations he saw take place there. Ibn Taymiyyah represented the Hanbali school of thought during this time. The Hanbali school was seen as the most traditional school out of the four legal systems (Hanafi, Maliki and Shafii) because it was "suspicious of the Hellenist disciplines of philosophy and speculative theology." He remained faithful throughout his life to this school, whose doctrines he had mastered, but he nevertheless called for ijtihad (independent reasoning by one who is qualified) and discouraged taqlid.

Relationship with the authorities 
Ibn Taymiyyah's emergence in the public and political spheres began in 1293 when he was 30 years old, when the authorities asked him to issue a fatwa (legal verdict) on Assaf al-Nasrani, a Christian cleric who was accused of insulting Muhammad. He accepted the invitation and delivered his fatwa, calling for the man to receive the death penalty. Despite the fact that public opinion was very much on Ibn Taymiyyah's side, the Governor of Syria attempted to resolve the situation by asking Assaf to accept Islam in return for his life, to which he agreed. This resolution was not acceptable to Ibn Taymiyyah who then, together with his followers, protested against it outside the governor's palace, demanding that Assaf be put to death, on the grounds that any person—Muslim or non-Muslim—who insults Muhammad must be killed. His unwillingness to compromise, coupled with his attempt to protest against the governor's actions, resulted in him being punished with a prison sentence, the first of many such imprisonments which were to come. The French orientalist Henri Laoust says that during his incarceration, Ibn Taymiyyah "wrote his first great work, al-Ṣārim al-maslūl ʿalā shātim al-Rasūl (The Drawn Sword against those who insult the Messenger)." Ibn Taymiyyah, together with the help of his disciples, continued with his efforts against what, "he perceived to be un-Islamic practices" and to implement what he saw as his religious duty of commanding good and forbidding wrong. Yahya Michot says that some of these incidences included: "shaving children's heads", leading "an anti-debauchery campaign in brothels and taverns", hitting an atheist before his public execution, destroying what was thought to be a sacred rock in a mosque, attacking astrologers and obliging "deviant Sufi Shaykhs to make public acts of contrition and adhere to the Sunnah." Ibn Taymiyyah and his disciples used to condemn wine sellers and they would attack wine shops in Damascus by breaking wine bottles and pouring them onto the floor.

A few years later in 1296, he took over the position of one of his teachers (Zayn al-Din Ibn al-Munadjdjaal), taking the post of professor of Hanbali jurisprudence at the Hanbaliyya madrasa, the oldest such institution of this tradition in Damascus. This is seen by some to be the peak of his scholarly career. The year when he began his post at the Hanbaliyya madrasa, was a time of political turmoil. The Mamluk sultan Al-Adil Kitbugha was deposed by his vice-sultan Al-Malik al-Mansur Lajin who then ruled from 1297 to 1299. Lajin desired to commission an expedition against the Christians of the Armenian Kingdom of Cilicia who formed an alliance with the Mongol Empire and participated in the military campaign which lead to the destruction of Baghdad, the capital of the Abbasid Caliphate, and the destruction of Harran, the birthplace of Ibn Taymiyyah, for that purpose, he urged Ibn Taymiyyah to call the Muslims to Jihad.

In 1298, Ibn Taymiyyah wrote his explanation for the ayat al-mutashabihat (the unclear verses of the Qur'an) titled Al-`Aqidat al-Hamawiyat al-Kubra (The creed of the great people of Hama). The book is about divine attributes and it served as an answer to a question from the city of Hama, Syria. At that particular time Ash'arites held prominent positions within the Islamic scholarly community in both Syria and Egypt, and they held a certain position on the divine attributes of God. Ibn Taymiyyah in his book strongly disagreed with their views and this heavy opposition to the common Ash'ari position, caused considerable controversy.

Once more, Ibn Taymiyyah collaborated with the Mamluks in 1300, when he joined the punitive expedition against the Alawites and Shiites, in the Kasrawan region of the Lebanese mountains. Ibn Taymiyyah believed that the Alawites were "more heretical than Jews and Christians", and according to Carole Hillenbrand, the confrontation with the Alawites occurred because they "were accused of collaborating with Christians and Mongols." Ibn Taymiyya had further active involvements in campaigns against the Mongols and their alleged Alawite allies.

In 1305, Ibn Taymiyyah took part in a second military offensive against the Alawites and the Isma`ilis in the Kasrawan region of the Lebanese mountains where they were defeated. The majority of the Alawis and Ismailis eventually converted to Twelver Shiism and settled in south Lebanon and the Bekaa valley, with a few Shia pockets that survived in the Lebanese mountains.

Involvement in the Mongol invasions

First invasion 

The first invasion took place between December 1299 and April 1300 due to the military campaign by the Mamluks against the Armenian Kingdom of Cilicia who were allied with the Mongols. Due to the Mongol legal system that neglected sharia and implemented Yassa; Ibn Taymiyya had declared Takfir upon the Ilkhanid regime and its armies for ruling by man-made laws, despite these laws being rarely enforced in Muslim majority regions in an extensive manner. Openly rejecting Ghazan Khan's claim to "pādishāh al-islām" (King of Islam), a title which Ghazan took to legitimise his military campaigns, Ibn Taymiyya denounced him as an "infidel king" and issued numerous fatwas condemning the political order of the Tatars. The Ilkhanate army managed to managed to defeat the Mamluk Sultanate in The Third Battle of Homs and reach Damascus by the end of December 1299. Fearful of Mongol atrocities, many scholars, intellectuals and officers began to flee Damascus in panic. Ibn Taymiyya was one of those clerics who stood firm alongside the vulnerable Damascene citizens and called for an uncompromisng and heroic resistance to the Tatar invaders. Ibn Taymiyya drew parallels of their crisis with the Riddah wars (Apostate wars) fought by the first Muslim Caliph, Abubakr, against the renegade Arabian tribes that abandoned sharia. Ibn Taymiyya severely rebuked those Muslims escaping in the face of Mongol onslaught and compared their state to the withdrawal of Muslims in the Battle of Uhud. In a passionate letter to the commander of the Damascene Citadel, Ibn Taymiyya appealed: "Until there stands even a single rock, do everything in your power to not surrender the castle. There is great benefit for the people of Syria. Allah declared it a sanctuary for the people of Shām—where it will remain a land of faith and sunna until the descent of the Prophet Jesus.”Despite political pressure, Ibn Taymiyya's directives were heeded by the Mamluk officer and Mongol negotiations to surrender the Citadel stalled. Shortly after, Ibn Taymiyya and a number of his acolytes and pupils took part in a counter-offensive targeting various Shia tribes allied to the Mongols in the peripheral regions of the city; thereby repelling the Mongol attack. Ibn Taymiyyah went with a delegation of Islamic scholars to talk to Ghazan Khan, who was the Khan of the Mongol Ilkhanate of Iran, to plead clemency and to stop his attack on the Muslims. It is reported that none of the scholars said anything to the Khan except Ibn Taymiyyah who said:

You claim that you are Muslim and you have with you Mu'adhdhins, Muftis, Imams and Shaykhs but you invaded us and reached our country for what? While your father and your grandfather, Hulagu were non-believers, they did not attack and they kept their promise. But you promised and broke your promise.

By early January 1300, the Mongol allies, the Armenians and Georgians, had caused widespread damage to Damascus and they had taken Syrian prisoners. The Mongols effectively occupied Damascus for the first four months of 1303. Most of the military had fled the city, including most of the civilians. Ibn Taymiyyah however, stayed and was one of the leaders of the resistance inside Damascus and he went to speak directly to the Ilkhan, Mahmud Ghazan, and his vizier Rashid al-Din Tabib. He sought the release of Muslim and dhimmi prisoners which the Mongols had taken in Syria, and after negotiation, secured their release.

Second invasion 
The second invasion lasted between October 1300 and January 1301. Ibn Taymiyyah at this time began giving sermons on jihad at the Umayyad mosque. As the civilians began to flee in panic; Ibn Taymiyya pronounced fatwas declaring the religious duty upon Muslims to fight the Mongol armies to death, inflict a massive defeat and expel them from Syria in its entirety. Ibn Taymiyyah also spoke to and encouraged the Governor of Damascus, al-Afram, to achieve victory over the Mongols. He became involved with al-Afram once more, when he was sent to get reinforcements from Cairo. Narrating Ibn Taymiyya's fierce stance on fighting the Mongols, Ibn Kathir reports:

Third invasion and Takfir of Ilkhanate Allies 

The year 1303 saw the third Mongol invasion of Syria by Ghazan Khan. What has been called Ibn Taymiyyah's "most famous" fatwā was his third fatwa issued against the Mongols in the Mamluk's war. Ibn Taymiyyah declared that jihad against the Mongol attack on the Malmuk sultanate was not only permissible, but obligatory. The reason being that the Mongols could not, in his opinion, be true Muslims despite the fact that they had converted to Sunni Islam because they ruled using what he considered 'man-made laws' (their traditional Yassa code) rather than Islamic law or Sharia, whilst believing that the Yassa code was better than the Sharia law. Because of this, he reasoned they were living in a state of jahiliyyah, or pre-Islamic pagan ignorance. Not only were Ilkhanate political elites and its military disbelievers in the eyes of Ibn Taymiyya; but anybody who joined their ranks were as guilty of riddah (apostasy) as them: 

The fatwa broke new Islamic legal ground because "no jurist had ever before issued a general authorization for the use of lethal force against Muslims in battle", and would later influence modern-day Jihadists in their use of violence against other Muslims whom they deemed as apostates. In his legal verdicts issued to inform the populace, Ibn Taymiyya classified the Tatars and their advocates into four types:

 Kaafir Asli (i.e, those original non-Muslims fighting inTatar armies and never embraced Islam)

 Muslims of other ethincities who became apostates due to their alliance with Mongols
 Irreligious Muslims aligned with Ilkhanids whom Ibn Taymiyya analogized with renegade Arabian tribes of the Riddah wars
 Personally pious Muslims affiliated with the Mongol armies. Ibn Taymiyya harshly rebuked these people as the "most evil" faction; and argued that their piety was useless because of their decision to  ally with non-Muslims who ruled by man-made laws. This rationale was also expanded to excommunicate those "court scholars" who vindicated the Tatar authorities

Ibn Taymiyyah called on the Muslims to jihad once again and personally participated in the Battle of Marj al-Saffar against the Ilkhanid army; leading his disciples in the field with a sword. The battle began on April 20 of that year. On the same day, Ibn Taymiyyah declared a fatwa which exempted Mamluk soldiers from fasting during Ramadan so that they could preserve their strength. Within two days the Mongols were severely crushed and the battle was won; thus ending Mongol control of Syria. These incidents greatly increased the scholarly prestige and social stature of Ibn Taymiyya amongst the masses, despite opposition from the establishment clergy. He would soon be appointed as the chief professor of the elite scholarly institute "Kāmiliyya Dār al-Haḍīth."

Contemporary Impact 
Ibn Taymiyya's three unprecedented fatwas (legal verdicts) that excommunicated the Ilkhanid authorities and their supporters as apostates over their neglect to govern by Sharia (Islamic law) and preference of the traditional Mongol imperial code of Yassa; would form the theological basis of 20th century Islamist and Jihadist scholars and ideologues. Reviving Ibn Taymiyya's fatwas during the late 20th-century, Jihadist ideologues like Sayyid Qutb, Abd al-Salam al-Faraj, Abdullah Azzam, Usama bin Laden, Ayman al-Zawahiri, etc. made public Takfir (excommunication) of contemporary governments of the Muslim world and called for their revolutionary overthrowal through armed Jihad.

Imprisonment on charges of anthropomorphism 
Ibn Taymiyya was a fervent polemicist who waged perpetual theological attacks against various religious sects such as the Sufis, Jahmites, Asha'rites, Shias, Falsafa etc., labelling them as heretics responsible for the crisis of Mongol invasions across the Islamic World. He was imprisoned several times for conflicting with the prevailing opinions of the jurists and theologians of his day. A judge from the city of Wasit, Iraq, requested that Ibn Taymiyyah write a book on creed. His subsequent creedal work, Al-Aqidah Al-Waasitiyyah, caused him trouble with the authorities. Ibn Taymiyyah adopted the view that God should be described as he was literally described in the Qur'an and in the hadith, and that all Muslims were required to believe this because according to him it was the view held by the early Muslim community (salaf). Within the space of two years (1305–1306) four separate religious council hearings were held to assess the correctness of his creed.

The first hearing was held with Ash'ari scholars who accused Ibn Taymiyyah of anthropomorphism. At the time Ibn Taymiyyah was 42 years old. He was protected by the then Governor of Damascus, Aqqush al-Afram, during the proceedings. The scholars suggested that he accept that his creed was simply that of the Hanbalites and offered this as a way out of the charge. However, if Ibn Taymiyyah ascribed his creed to the Hanbali school of law then it would be just one view out of the four schools which one could follow rather than a creed everybody must adhere to. Uncompromising, Ibn Taymiyyah maintained that it was obligatory for all scholars to adhere to his creed.

Two separate councils were held a year later on January 22 and 28, 1306. The first council was in the house of the Governor of Damascus Aqqush al-Afram, who had protected him the year before when facing the Shafii scholars. A second hearing was held six days later where the Indian scholar Safi al-Din al-Hindi found him innocent of all charges and accepted that his creed was in line with the "Qur'an and the Sunnah". Regardless, in April 1306 the chief Islamic judges of the Mamluk state declared Ibn Taymiyyah guilty and he was incarcerated. He was released four months later in September.

After his release in Damascus, the doubts regarding his creed seemed to have resolved but this was not the case. A Shafii scholar, Ibn al-Sarsari, was insistent on starting another hearing against Ibn Taymiyyah which was held once again at the house of the Governor of Damascus, Al-Afram. His book Al-Aqidah Al-Waasitiyyah was still not found at fault. At the conclusion of this hearing, Ibn Taymiyyah and Ibn al-Sarsari were sent to Cairo to settle the problem.

Life in Egypt

His debate on anthropomorphism and his imprisonment 
On the arrival of Ibn Taymiyyah and the Shafi'ite scholar in Cairo in 1306, an open meeting was held. The Mamluk sultan at the time was Al-Nasir Muhammad and his deputy attended the open meeting. Ibn Taymiyyah was found innocent. Despite the open meeting, objections regarding his creed continued and he was summoned to the Citadel in Cairo for a munazara (legal debate), which took place on April 8, 1306. During the munazara, his views on divine attributes, specifically whether a direction could be attributed to God, were debated by the Indian scholar Safi al-Din al-Hindi, in the presence of Islamic judges. Ibn Taymiyyah failed to convince the judges of his position and so was incarcerated for the charge of anthropomorphism on the recommendation of al-Hindi. Thereafter, he together with his two brothers were imprisoned in the Citadel of the Mountain (Qal'at al-Jabal), in Cairo until September 25, 1307. He was freed due to the help he received from two amirs; Salar and Muhanna ibn Isa, but he was not allowed to go back to Syria. He was then again summoned for a legal debate, but this time he convinced the judges that his views were correct and he was allowed to go free.

His trial for intercession and his imprisonment 

Ibn Taymiyyah continued to face troubles for his views which were found to be at odds with those of his contemporaries. His strong opposition to what he believed to be religious innovations, caused upset among the prominent Sufis of Egypt including Ibn Ata Allah and Karim al-Din al-Amuli, and the locals who started to protest against him. Their main contention was Ibn Taymiyyah's stance on tawassul (intercession). In his view, a person could not ask anyone other than God for help except on the Day of Judgement when intercession in his view would be possible. At the time, the people did not restrict intercession to just the Day of Judgement but rather they said it was allowed in other cases. Due to this, Ibn Taymiyyah, now aged 45, was ordered to appear before the Shafi'i judge Badr al-Din in March 1308 and was questioned on his stance regarding intercession. Thereafter, he was incarcerated in the prison of the judges in Cairo for some months. After his release, he was allowed to return to Syria, should he so wish. Ibn Taymiyyah however stayed in Egypt for a further five years.

House arrest in Alexandria 
1309, the year after his release, saw a new Mamluk sultan accede to the throne, Baibars al-Jashnakir. His reign, marked by economical and political unrest, only lasted a year. In August 1309, Ibn Taymiyyah was taken into custody and placed under house arrest for seven months in the new sultan's palace in Alexandria. He was freed when al-Nasir Muhammad retook the position of sultan on March 4, 1310. Having returned to Cairo a week later, he was received by al-Nasir. The sultan would sometimes consult Ibn Taymiyyah on religious affairs and policies during the rest of his three-year stay in Cairo. During this time he continued to teach and wrote his famous book Al-Kitab al-Siyasa al-shar'iyya (Treatise on the Government of the Religious Law), a book noted for its account of the role of religion in politics.

Return to Damascus and later years 
He spent his last fifteen years in Damascus. Aged 50, Ibn Taymiyyah returned to Damascus via Jerusalem on February 28, 1313. Damascus was now under the governorship of Tankiz. There, Ibn Taymiyyah continued his teaching role as professor of Hanbali fiqh. This is when he taught his most famous student, Ibn Qayyim Al-Jawziyya, who went on to become a noted scholar in Islamic history. Ibn Qayyim was to share in Ibn Taymiyyah's renewed persecution.

Three years after his arrival in the city, Ibn Taymiyyah became involved in efforts to deal with the increasing Shia influence amongst Sunni Muslims. An agreement had been made in 1316 between the amir of Mecca and the Ilkhanid ruler Öljaitü, brother of Ghazan Khan, to allow a favourable policy towards Shi'ism in the city. Around the same time the Shia theologian Al-Hilli, who had played a crucial role in the Mongol ruler's decision to make Shi'ism the state religion of Persia, wrote the book Minhaj al-Karamah (The Way of Charisma'), which dealt with the Shia doctrine of the Imamate and also served as a refutation of the Sunni doctrine of the caliphate. In response, Ibn Taymiyyah wrote his famous book, Minhaj as-Sunnah an-Nabawiyyah, as a refutation of Al-Hilli's work.

his fatwa on divorce and imprisonment 
In 1318, Ibn Taymiyyah wrote a treatise that would curtail the ease with which a Muslim man could divorce his wife. Ibn Taymiyyah's fatwa on divorce was not accepted by the majority of scholars of the time and this continued into the Ottoman era. However, almost every modern Muslim nation-state has come to adopt Ibn Taymiyyah's position on this issue of divorce. At the time he issued the fatwa, Ibn Taymiyyah revived an edict by the sultan not to issue fatwas on this issue but he continued to do so, saying, "I cannot conceal my knowledge". As in previous instances, he stated that his fatwa was based on the Qur'an and hadith. His view on the issue was at odds with the Hanbali position. This proved controversial among the people in Damascus as well as the Islamic scholars who opposed him on the issue.

According to the scholars of the time, an oath of divorce counted as a full divorce and they were also of the view that three oaths of divorce taken under one occasion counted as three separate divorces. The significance of this was, that a man who divorces the same partner three times is no longer allowed to remarry that person until and if that person marries and divorces another person. Only then could the man, who took the oath, remarry his previous wife. Ibn Taymiyyah accepted this but rejected the validity of three oaths taken under one sitting to count as three separate divorces as long as the intention was not to divorce. Moreover, Ibn Taymiyyah was of the view that a single oath of divorce uttered but not intended, also does not count as an actual divorce. He stated that since this is an oath much like an oath taken in the name of God, a person must expiate for an unintentional oath in a similar manner.

Due to his views and also by not abiding to the sultan's letter two years before forbidding him from issuing a fatwa on the issue, three council hearings were held, in as many years (1318, 1319 and 1320), to deal with this matter. The hearing were overseen by the Viceroy of Syria, Tankiz. This resulted in Ibn Taymiyyah being imprisoned on August 26, 1320, in the Citadel of Damascus. He was released about five months and 18 days later, on February 9, 1321, by order of the Sultan Al-Nasir. Ibn Taymiyyah was reinstated as teacher of Hanbali law and he resumed teaching.

His risāla on visits to tombs and his final imprisonment 
In 1310, Ibn Taymiyyah had written a risāla (treatise) called Ziyārat al-Qubūr or according to another source, Shadd al-rihal. It dealt with the validity and permissibility of making a journey to visit the tombs of prophets and saints. It is reported that in the book "he condemned the cult of saints" and declared that traveling with the sole purpose of visiting Muhammad's grave was a blameworthy religious innovation. For this, Ibn Taymiyyah, was imprisoned in the Citadel of Damascus sixteen years later on July 18, 1326, aged 63, along with his student Ibn Qayyim. The sultan also prohibited him from issuing any further fatwas. Hanbali scholar Ahmad ibn Umar al-Maqdisi accused Ibn Taymiyah of apostasy over the treatise.

His life in prison 

Ibn Taymiyyah referred to his imprisonment as "a divine blessing". During his incarceration, he wrote that, "when a scholar forsakes what he knows of the Book of God and of the sunnah of His messenger and follows the ruling of a ruler which contravenes a ruling of God and his messenger, he is a renegade, an unbeliever who deserves to be punished in this world and in the hereafter."

During his imprisonment, he encountered opposition from the Maliki and Shafii Chief Justices of Damascus, Taḳī al-Dīn al-Ikhnāʾī. He remained in prison for over two years and ignored the sultan's prohibition, by continuing to deliver fatwas. During his incarceration Ibn Taymiyyah wrote three works which are extant; Kitāb Maʿārif al-wuṣūl, Rafʿ al-malām, and Kitāb al-Radd ʿala 'l-Ikhnāʾī (The response to al-Ikhnāʾī). The last book was an attack on Taḳī al-Dīn al-Ikhnāʾī and explained his views on saints (wali).

When the Mongols invaded Syria in 1300, he was among those who called for a Jihad against them and he ruled that even though they had recently converted to Islam, they should be considered unbelievers. He went to Egypt in order to acquire support for his cause and while he was there, he got embroiled in religious-political disputes. Ibn Taymiyyah's enemies accused him of advocating anthropomorphism, a view that was objectionable to the teachings of the Ash'ari school of Islamic theology, and in 1306, he was imprisoned for more than a year. Upon his release, he condemned popular Sufi practices and he also condemned the influence of Ibn Arabi (d. 1240), causing him to earn the enmity of leading Sufi shaykhs in Egypt and causing him to serve another prison sentence. In 1310, he was released by the Egyptian Sultan.

In 1313, the Sultan allowed Ibn Taymiyyah to return to Damascus, where he worked as a teacher and a jurist. He had supporters among the powerful, but his outspokenness and his nonconformity to traditional Sunni doctrines and his denunciation of Sufi ideals and practices continued to draw the wrath of the religious and political authorities in Syria and Egypt. He was arrested and released several more times, but while he was in prison, he was allowed to write Fatwas (advisory opinions on matters of law) in defense of his beliefs. Despite the controversy that surrounded him, Ibn Taymiyyah's influence grew and it spread from Hanbali circles to members of other Sunni legal schools and Sufi groups. Among his foremost students were Ibn Kathir (d. 1373), a leading medieval historian and a Quran commentator, and Ibn Qayyim al-Jawziya (d. 1350), a prominent Hanbali jurist and a theologian who helped spread his teacher's influence after his teacher's death in 1328. Ibn Taymiyyah died while he was a prisoner in the citadel of Damascus and he was buried in the city's Sufi cemetery.

Death 
He fell ill in early September 1328 and died at the age of 65, on September 26 of that year, whilst in prison at the Citadel of Damascus. Once this news reached the public, there was a strong show of support for him from the people. After the authorities had given permission, it is reported that thousands of people came to show their respects. They gathered in the Citadel and lined the streets up to the Umayyad Mosque. The funeral prayer was held in the citadel by scholar Muhammad Tammam, and a second was held in the mosque. A third and final funeral prayer was held by Ibn Taymiyyah's brother, Zain al-Din. He was buried in Damascus, in Maqbara Sufiyya ("the cemetery of the Sufis"). His brother Sharafuddin had been buried in that cemetery before him.

Oliver Leaman says that being deprived of the means of writing led to Ibn Taymiyyah's death. It is reported that two hundred thousand men and fifteen to sixteen thousand women attended his funeral prayer. Ibn Kathir says that in the history of Islam, only the funeral of Ahmad ibn Hanbal received a larger attendance. This is also mentioned by Ibn `Abd al-Hadi. Caterina Bori says that, "In the Islamic tradition, wider popular attendance at funerals was a mark of public reverence, a demonstration of the deceased's rectitude, and a sign of divine approbation."

Ibn Taymiyya is said to have "spent a lifetime objecting to tomb veneration, only to cast a more powerful posthumous spell than any of his Sufi contemporaries." On his death, his personal effects were in such demand "that bidders for his lice-killing camphor necklace pushed its price up to 150 dirhams, and his skullcap fetched a full 500." A few mourners sought and succeeded in "drinking the water used for bathing his corpse." His tomb received "pilgrims and sightseers" for 600 years. Almost 600 years after his death, the large Sufi cemetery where he was buried in was razed for redevelopment by French colonial authorities. His grave alone was left untouched after the Arab demolition teams "insisted" that his grave "was too holy to touch." . His resting place is now "in the parking lot of a maternity ward", though as of 2009 its headstone was broken, according to author Sadakat Kadri.

Students 
Several of Ibn Taymiyyah's students became scholars in their own right. His students came from different backgrounds and belonged to various different schools (madhabs). His most famous students were Ibn Qayyim Al-Jawziyya and Ibn Kathir. His other students include:

Legacy 
In the 21st century, Ibn Taymiyya is one of the most cited medieval authors and his treatises are regarded to be of central intellectual importance by several Islamic revivalist movements. Ibn Taymiyya's disciples, consisting of both Hanbalis and non-Hanbalis, were attracted to his advocacy of ijtihad outside the established boundaries of the madhabs and shared his taste for activism and religious reform. Some of his unorthodox legal views in the field of Fiqh were also regarded as a challenge by mainstream Fuqaha. Many scholars have argued that Ibn Taymiyyah did not enjoy popularity among the intelligentsia of his day. Yossef Rapoport and Shahab Ahmed assert that he was a minority figure in his own times and the centuries that followed. Caterina Bori goes further, arguing that despite popularity Ibn Taymiyya may have enjoyed among the masses, he appears to have been not merely unpopular among the scholars of his day, but somewhat of an embarrassment. Khalid El-Rouayheb notes similarly that Ibn Taymiyyah had "very little influence on mainstream Sunni Islam until the nineteenth century" and that he was "a little-read scholar with problematic and controversial views." He also comments "the idea that Ibn Taymiyyah had an immediate and significant impact on the course of Sunni Islamic religious history simply does not cohere with the evidence that we have from the five centuries that elapsed between his death and the rise of Sunni revivalism in the modern period." It was only since the late nineteenth and the early twentieth centuries that the scholarly influence of Ibn Taymiyya has come to acquire an unprecedented prominence in Muslim societies, due to the efforts of Islamic revivalists like Rashid Rida. On the other hand, Prof. Al-Matroudi of SOAS university says that Ibn Taymiyyah, "was perhaps the most eminent and influential Hanbali jurist of the Middle Ages and one of the most prolific among them. He was also a renowned scholar of Islam whose influence was felt not only during his lifetime but extended through the centuries until the present day." Ibn Taymiyyah's followers often deemed him as Sheikh ul-Islam, an honorific title with which he is sometimes still termed today.

In the pre-modern era, Ibn Taymiyyah was considered a controversial figure within Sunni Islam and had a number of critics during his life and in the centuries thereafter. The Shafi'i scholar Ibn Hajar al-Haytami stated that,

He also stated that,

Taqi al-Din al-Hisni condemned Ibn Taymiyya in even stronger terms by referring to him as the "heretic from Harran" and similarly, Munawi considered Ibn Taymiyyah to be an innovator though not an unbeliever. Taqi al-Din al-Subki criticised Ibn Taymiyyah for "contradicting the consensus of the Muslims by his anthropomorphism, by his claims that accidents exist in God, by suggesting that God was speaking in time, and by his belief in the eternity of the world." Ibn Battūta (d. 770/1369) famously wrote a work questioning Ibn Taymiyyah's mental state. The possibility of psychological abnormalities not with-standing, Ibn Taymiyya's personality, by multiple accounts, was fiery and oftentimes unpredictable. The historian Al-Maqrizi said, regarding the rift between the Sunni Ash'ari's and Ibn Taymiyyah, "People are divided into two factions over the question of Ibn Taymiyyah; for until the present, the latter has retained admirers and disciples in Syria and Egypt." Both his supporters and rivals grew to respect Ibn Taymiyyah because he was uncompromising in his views. Dhahabi's views towards Ibn Taymiyya were ambivalent. His praise of Ibn Taymiyya is invariably qualified with criticism and misgivings and he considered him to be both a "brilliant Shaykh" and also "cocky" and "impetuous". The Hanafi-Maturidi scholar 'Ala' al-Din al-Bukhari said that anyone that gives Ibn Taymiyya the title Shaykh al-Islām is a disbeliever. As a reaction, his contemporary Nasir ad-Din ad-Dimashqi wrote a refutation in which he quoted the 85 greatest scholars, from Ibn Taymiyyah's till his time, who called Ibn Taymiyyah with the title Shaykh al-Islam.

Despite the prevalent condemnations of Ibn Taymiyya outside Hanbali school during the pre-modern period, many prominent non-Hanbali scholars such as Ibrahim al-Kurrani (d.1690), Shāh Walī Allāh al-Dihlawi (d. 1762), Mehmet Birgiwi (d. 1573), Ibn al-Amīr Al-San'ani (d. 1768), Muḥammad al-Shawkānī (d. 1834), etc. would come to the defense of Ibn Taymiyya and advocate his ideas during this era. In the 18th century, influential South Asian Islamic scholar and revivalist Shah Waliullah Dehlawi would become the most prominent advocate of the doctrines of Ibn Taymiyya, and profoundly transformed the religious thought in South Asia. His seminary, Madrasah-i-Rahimya, became a hub of intellectual life in the country, and the ideas developed there quickly spread to wider academic circles. Making a powerful defense of Ibn Taymiyya and his doctrines, Shah Waliullah wrote: 

The reputation and stature of Ibn Taymiyya amongst non-Ḥanbalī Sunni scholars would significantly improve between the eighteenth and twentieth centuries. From a little-read scholar considered controversial by many, he would become one of the most popular scholarly figures in the Sunni religious tradition. The nineteenth-century Iraqi scholar Khayr al-Dīn al-Ālūsī (d. 1899) wrote an influential treatise titled Jalā’ al-‘aynayn fi muḥākamat al-Aḥmadayn in defense of Ibn Taymiyya. The treatise would make great impact on major scholars of the Salafiyya movement in Syria and Egypt, such as Jamāl al-Dīn al-Qāsimī (d. 1914) and Muḥammad Rashīd Riḍā (d. 1935). Praising Ibn Taymiyya as a central and heroic Islamic figure of the classical era, Rashid Rida wrote:

Ibn Taymiyyah's works served as an inspiration for later Muslim scholars and historical figures, who have been regarded as his admirers or disciples. In the contemporary world, he may be considered at the root of Wahhabism, the Senussi order and other later reformist movements. Ibn Taymiyyah has been noted to have influenced Rashid Rida, Abul A`la Maududi, Sayyid Qutb, Hassan al-Banna, Abdullah Azzam, and Osama bin Laden. The terrorist organization Islamic State in Iraq and the Levant used a fatwa of Ibn Taymiyyah to justify the burning alive of Jordanian pilot Muath al-Kasasbeh. After the Iranian revolution, conservative Sunni ulema robustly championed Ibn Taymiyya's anti-Shia polemics across the Islamic World since the 1980s; and vast majority of Sunni intellectual circles adopted Ibn Taymiyya's rhetoric against Shi'ism.

Influences 

Ibn Taymiyyah was taught by scholars who were renowned in their time. However, there is no evidence that any of the contemporary scholars influenced him.

A strong influence on Ibn Taymiyyah was the founder of the Hanbali school of Islamic jurisprudence, Ahmad ibn Hanbal. Ibn Taymiyyah was trained in this school and he had studied Ibn Hanbal's Musnad in great detail, having studied it over multiple times. Though he spent much of his life following this school, in the end he renounced taqlid (blind following).

His work was most influenced by the sayings and actions of the Salaf (first 3 generation of Muslims) and this showed in his work where he would give preference to the Salaf over his contemporaries. The modern Salafi movement derives its name from this school of thought.

In what may justifiably be described as an unscrupulous attempt of magnifying the purported influence of Ibn Taymiyyah on Jewish theology, the claim of the late Pakistani Islamic scholar Mawdudi deserves to be mentioned; if only for the purpose of correcting the published record. In his treatise Tajdīd-o-Ahyā-e-Dīn (Lahore: Islamic Publications, 31st Printing: 1999, p. 76; English edition translated by Al-Ash`ari titled: A Short History of the Revivalist Movement in Islam, Lahore: Islamic Publications, 9th edition: 2004, p. 43), Mawdudi advances the following claim about the influence of Ibn Taymiyyah by appealing to the authority of the great scholar Goldziher:
... he had acquired such an insight into the Jewish and Christian literatures and the differences between their religious sects that, according to Goldziher, no scholar who wanted to deal with the characters of the Bible could lose sight of and set aside the researches of Ibn-i-Taimiyyah.

As a matter of fact Goldziher expressed his views and analyses about Ibn Taymiyyah's influence in his The Zāhirīs (Engl. tr. 2008, pp. 173–177) as well as in his article on Ibn Taymiyyah in the Encyclopedia of Religion and Ethics (Vol. 7, p. 72). In neither of the mentioned writings does Goldziher say anything amounting to what Mawdudi attributed to him in his above-cited claim. What Goldziher did write was the following:
In his writings he [i.e. Ibn Taymiyyah] is a zealous adversary of Greek philosophy, Judaism, and Christianity. By way of inciting the Muslims against them, he pointed to the Mongol invasion which had just swept over Syria, asserting that the visitation was in part due to the laxity of his co-religionists. He issued a fatwa demanding
that the Jewish synagogues in Cairo should be destroyed, and urging his people not to allow the chapels of other faiths to exist in their midst...

Views

God's attributes 

Ibn Taymiyyah said that God should be described as he has described himself in the Qur'an and the way Muhammad has described God in the Hadith. He rejected the Ta'tili's who denied these attributes, those who compare God with the creation (Tashbih) and those who engage in esoteric interpretations (ta'wil) of the Qur'an or use symbolic exegesis. Ibn Taymiyyah said that those attributes which we know about from the two above mentioned sources, should be ascribed to God. Anything regarding God's attributes which people have no knowledge of, should be approached in a manner, according to Ibn Taymiyyah, where the mystery of the unknown is left to God (called tafwid) and the Muslims submit themselves to the word of God and the prophet (called taslim). Henri Laoust says that through this framework, this doctrine, "provides authority for the widest possible scope in personal internationalization of religion."

In 1299, Ibn Taymiyyah wrote the book Al-Aqida al-hamawiyya al-kubra, which dealt with, among other topics, theology and creed. When he was accused of anthropomorphism, a private meeting was held between scholars in the house of Al-Din `Umar al-Kazwini who was a Shafii judge. After careful study of this book, he was cleared of those charges. Ibn Taymiyyah also wrote another book dealing with the attributes of God called, Al-Aqidah Al-Waasitiyyah. He faced considerable hostility towards these views from the Ash'ari's of whom the most notable were, Taqi al-Din al-Subki and his son Taj al-Din al-Subki who were influential Islamic jurists and also chief judge of Damascus in their respective times.

Ibn Taymiyyah's highly intellectual discourse at explaining "The Wise Purpose of God, Human Agency, and the Problems of Evil & Justice" using God's Attributes as a means has been illustrated by Dr. Jon Hoover in his work Ibn Taymiyyah's Theodicy of Perpetual Optimism. Ibn Taymiyya regarded Tawhid al-Asma wa Sifat (‘monotheism of God's Names and Attributes’) as the third aspect of Tawhid and as part of Tawhid al-Uluhiyya (monotheism of Worship). According to Ibn Taymiyya, God must be worshipped by His Own Names and Attributes – by which He described himself in the Qur’ān and Hadith – and to do otherwise would be to commit shirk (polytheism) by associating God with improper ideas.

Duration of Hellfire 
Ibn Taymiyyah held the belief that Hell was not eternal even for unbelievers. According to Ibn Taymiyyah, Hell is therapeutic and reformative, and God's wise purpose in chastising unbelievers is to make them fit to leave the Fire. This view contradicted the mainstream Sunni doctrine of eternal hell-fire for unbelievers. Ibn Taymiyyah was criticised for holding this view by the chief Shafi scholar Taqi al-Din al-Subki who presented a large body of Qur'anic evidence to argue that unbelievers will abide in hell-fire eternally.
Ibn Taymiyyah was partially supported in his view by the Zaydi Shi'ite Ibn al-Wazir.

Sources of Sharīʿa 
Of the four fundamental sources of the sharia accepted by thirteenth century Sunni jurists—
Qur'an,
sunnah,
consensus of jurists (ijma), and
qiyas (analogical reasoning),

—Ibn Taymiyyah opposed the use of consensus of jurists, replacing it with the consensus of the "companions" (sahaba).

Like all Islamic jurists Ibn Taymiyyah believed in a hierarchy sources for the Sharia. Most important was the Quran, and the sunnah or any other source could not abrogate a verse of the Qur'an. (For him, an abrogation of a verse, known in Arabic as Naskh, was only possible through another verse in the Qur'an.) Next was sunnah which other sources (besides the Quran) must not contradict.

Consensus (ijmaʾ) 
Concerning Consensus (ijma), he believed that consensus of any Muslims other than that of the companions of Muhammad could not be "realistically verifiable" and so was speculative, and thus not a legitimate source of Islamic law (except in certain circumstances). The consensus (ijma) used must be that of the companions found in their reported sayings or actions. According one supporter, Serajul Haque, his rejection of the consensus of other scholars was justified, on the basis of the instructions given to the jurist Shuraih ibn al-Hârith from the Caliph Umar, one of the companions of Muhammad; to make decisions by first referring to the Qur'an, and if that is not possible, then to the sayings of Muhammad and finally to refer to the agreement of the companions like himself.

An example of Ibn Taymiyyah use of his interpretation was in defense of the (temporary) closing of all Christian churches in 1299 in the Mamluk Sultanate during hostility against crusader states. The closing was in violation of a 600-year-old covenant with Christian dhimmis known as the Pact of Umar. But as Ibn Taymiyyah pointed out, while venerable, the pact was written 60 years or so after the time of the companions and so had no legal effect.

Analogy (qiyās) 
Ibn Taymiyyah considered the use of analogy (qiyas) based on literal meaning of scripture as a valid source for deriving legal rulings. Analogy is the primary instrument of legal rationalism in Islam. He acknowledged its use as one of the four fundamental principles of Islamic jurisprudence. Ibn Taymiyyah argued against the certainty of syllogistic arguments and in favour of analogy. He argues that concepts founded on induction are themselves not certain but only probable, and thus a syllogism based on such concepts is no more certain than an argument based on analogy. He further claimed that induction itself depends on a process of analogy. His model of analogical reasoning was based on that of juridical arguments. Works by American computer scientists like John F. Sowa have, for example, have used Ibn Taymiyyah's model of analogy. He attached caveats however to the use of analogy because he considered the use of reason to be secondary to the use of revelation. Ibn Taymiyyah's view was that analogy should be used under the framework of revelation, as a supporting source.

There were some jurists who thought rulings derived through analogy could contradict a ruling derived from the Qur'an and the authentic hadith. However, Ibn Taymiyyah disagreed because he thought a contradiction between the definitive canonical texts of Islam, and definitive reason was impossible and that this was also the understanding of the salaf. Racha el-Omari says that on an epistemological level, Ibn Taymiyyah considered the Salaf to be better than any other later scholars in understanding the agreement between revelation and reason. One example for this is the use of analogy in the Islamic legal principle of maslaha (public good) about which Ibn Taymiyya believed, if there were to be any contradiction to revelation then it is due to a misunderstanding or misapplication of the concept of utility. He said that to assess the utility of something, the criteria for benefit and harm should come from the Qur'an and sunnah, a criterion which he also applied to the establishment of a correct analogy.

An example of Ibn Taymiyyah's use of analogy was in a fatwa forbidding the use of hashish on the grounds that it was analogous to wine, and users should be given 80 lashes in punishment. "Anyone who disagreed was an apostate, he added, whose corpse ought not to be washed or given a decent burial."

Prayer (Duʿāʾ) 

Ibn Taymiyyah issued a fatwa deeming it acceptable to perform dua in languages other than Arabic:

It is permissible to make du’aa’ in Arabic and in languages other than Arabic. Allaah knows the intention of the supplicant and what he wants, no matter what language he speaks, because He hears all the voices in all different languages, asking for all kinds of needs.

This view was also shared by an earlier theologian and jurist, Abu Hanifa.

Interest (Rįbā) 
Ibn Taymiyya held the view that the lender of a loan is allowed to recover the original, inflation adjusted value. Ahmad ibn Hanbal, the eponym of the Hanbali madh'hab believed that only the practice of 'pay or increase' – which extended delay to debtors in exchange for rise in the principal – as the only form of riba (i.e., Riba al-Jahiliyya) that was definitively and conclusively prohibited in Shari'ah (Islamic law). Ibn Qudama, another notable Hanbali jurist that preceded Ibn Taymiyya; opined that debtors who took loans involving unweighable, immeasurable objects should give back the original value to the creditors. This provided a basis for the argument that a creditor is allowed to "recover a sum equivalent to the amount by which the original principal lent has depreciated in real terms during the period of the loan". Building on Ibn Qudama's specific argument on unweighable objects, Ibn Taymiyya would argue for a more general view. He stipulated that the lender should be able to recover the original, inflation-adjusted value; reasoning that lenders unable to recover for losses from inflation would be far less inclined to grant future loans. In Ibn Taymiyya's view, such a lender was not involved in riba, since he has not made any actual profit out of the transaction.
Ibn Taymiyya held that the term riba also included all types of interest resulting from late payment (riba al-nasi'ah) or due to unequal exchange of the same commodity (riba al-fadl). Riba thus covers some cases of barter which involve exchanges unequal by way of quantity or time of delivery.

Reason (ʿAql) 

Issues surrounding the use of reason ('Aql) and rational came about in relation to the attributes of God for which he faced much resistance. At the time, Ashari and Maturidi theologians thought the literal attributes of God as stated in the Qur'an were contradictory to reason so sought to interpret them metaphorically. Ibn Taymiyyah believed that reason itself validated the entire Qur'an as being reliable and in light of that he argued, if some part of the scripture was to be rejected then this would render the use of reason as an unacceptable avenue through which to seek knowledge. He thought that the most perfect rational method and use of reason was contained within the Qur'an and sunnah and that the theologians of his time had used rational and reason in a flawed manner.

Condemning formal logic as "laughable and boring", Ibn Taymiyya writes: "The validity of the form of the syllogism is irrefutable, but it does not lead to knowledge of things in the external world... Even if the syllogism yields certitude, it cannot alone lead to certainty about things existing in the external world... It must be maintained that the numerous figures they have elaborated and the conditions they have stipulated for their validity are useless, tedious, and prolix. These resemble the flesh of a camel found of the summit of a mountain, the mountain is not easy to climb, nor the flesh plump enough to make it worth the hauling"

Criticism of the grammarians 
Ibn Taymiyyah had mastered the grammar of Arabic and one of the books which he studied was the book of Arabic grammar called Al-Kitab, by Sibawayh. In later life he met the Quranic exegete and grammarian Abu Hayyan al-Gharnati to whom he expressed that, "Sibawayh was not the prophet of syntax, nor was he infallible. He committed eighty mistakes in his book which are not intelligible to you." Ibn Taymiyyah is thought to have severely criticized Sibawayh but the actual substance of those criticisms is not known because the book within which he wrote the criticisms, al-Bahr, has been lost. He stated that when there is an explanation of an Ayah of the Qur'an or a Hadith, from the prophet himself, the use of philology or a grammatical explanation becomes obsolete. He also said one should refer only to the understanding of the Salaf (first three generations of Muslims) when interpreting a word within the scriptural sources. However he did not discount the contributions of the grammarians completely. Ibn Taymiyyah stated that the Arabic nouns within the scriptural sources have been divided by the fuqaha (Islamic jurists) into three categories; those that are defined by the shari'a, those defined by philology (lugha) and finally those that are defined by social custom (`urf). For him each of these categories of nouns had to be used in their own appropriate manner.

Maddhabs 

Ibn Taymiyyah censured the scholars for blindly conforming (Taqlid) to the precedence of early jurists without any resort to the Qur'an and Sunnah. He contended that although juridical precedence has its place, blindly giving it authority without contextualization, sensitivity to societal changes, and evaluative mindset in light of the Qur'an and Sunnah can lead to ignorance and stagnancy in Islamic Law. Ibn Taymiyyah likened the extremism of Taqlid (blind conformity to juridical precedence or school of thought) to the practice of Jews and Christians who took their rabbis and ecclesiastics as gods besides God. In arguing against taqlid, he stated that the Salaf, who to better understand and live according to the commands of God, had to make ijtihad using the scriptural sources. The same approach, in his view, was needed in modern times. Ibn Taymiyya considered his attachment to the Ḥanbalī school as a scholarly choice based on his Ijtihad (independent legal reasoning), rather than on imitation (taqlīd). Based on the principles and legal methodology of Imam Ahmad ibn Hanbal, Ibn Taymiyya issued fatwas as per scriptural evidence, rather than juristic opinion (ra'y). He insisted that the dominant opinion of Hanbali school transmitted through Ahmad's reports is not necessarily the correct view in sharia and often critiqued the rulings of prominent Hanbali Fuqaha.

Ibn Taymiyyah believed that the best role models for Islamic life were the first three generations of Islam (Salaf); which constitute Muhammad's companions, referred to in Arabic as Sahaba (first generation), followed by the generation of Muslims born after the death of Muhammad known as the Tabi'un (second generation) which is then followed lastly by the next generation after the Tabi'un known as Tabi' al-Tabi'in (third generation). Ibn Taymiyyah gave precedence to the ideas of the Sahaba and early generations, over the founders of the Islamic schools of jurisprudence. For Ibn Taymiyyah it was the Qur'an, the sayings and practices of Muhammad and the ideas of the early generations of Muslims that constituted the best understanding of Islam. Any deviation from their practice was viewed as bid'ah, or innovation, and to be forbidden. He also praised and wrote a commentary on some speeches of Abdul-Qadir Gilani.

Ibn Taymiyya asserted that every individual is permitted to employ Ijtihad partially as per his potential; despite the fact that scholars, jurists, etc. had superior knowledge and understanding of the law than the laity. Ibn Taymiyya writes:"Ijtihād is not one whole that cannot be subject to division and partition. A man could be a mujtahid in one discipline or one field (bāb) or an individual legal question, without being a mujtahid in all other disciplines, or books, or questions. Everyone can practice ijtihād according to his abilities. When one observes a legal question that has been subject to a dispute among the scholars, and then one finds revealed texts in support of one of the opinions, with no known counter-evidence (mu‘āriḍ), then there are two choices.... The second option is to follow the opinion that he, in his own judgment, finds preponderant by the indicants from the revealed texts. He is then in agreement with the founder of a different school, yet for him the revealed texts remain uncorrupted, as they are not contradicted by his actions. And this is the right thing to do."

Conscious of the limitations of the human mind, Ibn Taymiyya does not reject taqlid completely; since most people are not capable to be a legal expert who can derive law from its sources. Ibn Taymiyya asserted throughout his legal writings that "God does not burden men with more than they are capable of undertaking." Even Fuqaha are allowed to attach themselves to a mad'hab (law school) so long as they prefer the evidences. However, Ibn Taymiyya denounced all manifestations of Madh'hab fanaticism and was careful to emphasize that school affiliations are not obligatory. He argued that opinions of any jurist, including the school founders were not proofs, and decried the prevalent legal approach; wherein the Fuqaha confined themselves to the opinions within their legal school without seeking the Scriptures. Consequently, Ibn Taymiyya stripped Sunni legal conformism of any definitive, static religious authority. In his treatise "Removal of Blame from the Great Imams", Ibn Taymiyya explained the reasons for difference of opinions between jurists of various schools of law and justified the necessity for tolerance between the scholars of the madh'habs and their eponyms; reminding that every Mujtahid is rewarded twice if his Ijtihad is correct and rewarded once if his Ijtihad is faulty. Hence, a jurist acting in good faith should not incur blame for reaching the wrong conclusions. Thus, the Islamic scholarly system championed by Ibn Taymiyya subjected all Islamic jurists just to the authority of the revealed texts and not to the views of madh'habs, or jurists or any similar affiliations. Thus, Ibn Taymiyya envisioned a world in which individuals stand before the Divine revelation, with the intellectual freedom to discern the universal rulings of God's law to the best of their abilities.

Ikhtilaf 

Even though jurists may err in their fatwas; Ibn Taymiyya asserted that they should never be deterred from pursuing ijtihād. His outlook which was incompatible with a stagnated juristic system; propelled Ibn Taymiyya to advance legal pluralism; that defended the freedom of multiple juristic interpretations. According to Ibn Taymiyya, on legal issues which are subject to Ikhtilaf (scholarly disagreement); every Muslim is allowed to formulate and express his own opinion:"In these general matters [i.e., not a specific trial case] no judge, whoever he may be—even if he was one of the Companions—can impose his view on another person who does not share his opinion... In these matters, judgment is reserved for God and His messenger.. But, as long as the judgment of God is concealed, each of them is allowed to hold his opinion—the one saying ‘this is my opinion’ while the other says ‘this is my opinion.’ They are not allowed to prevent each other from expressing his opinion, except through the vehicles of knowledge, proof (ḥujja) and evidence (bayān), so that each speaks on the basis of the knowledge that he has."

Islamic law and policy 
Religion and the State should be inextricably linked, in his view, as the state was indispensable in providing justice to the people, enforcing Islamic law by enjoining good and forbidding evil, unifying the people and preparing a society conducive to the worship of God. He believed that "enjoining good and forbidding wrong" was the duty of every state functionary with charge over other Muslims, from the caliph to "the schoolmaster in charge of assessing children's handwriting exercises." Apart from his theological discourse that centered around Divine Attributes and God's Nature, Ibn Taymiyya also expanded Tawhid (Islamic montheism) doctrine to stress the significance of socio-political affairs. Ibn Taymiyya believed that monotheism in Islam affirmed God as the "sole creator, ruler, and judge of the world" and hence; Muslims are duty-bound to submit to Divine Commandments as revealed through Sharia (Islamic law) through both private and collective enforcement of religious rituals and morality.

Ibn Taymiyyah supported giving broad powers to the state. In Al-siyasa al-Sharʿiyah, he focused on duties of individuals and punishments rather than rules and procedural limits of authorities. Suspected highway robbers who would not reveal their accomplices or the location of their loot, for example should be held in detention and lashed for indefinite periods. He also allowed the lashing of imprisoned debtors, and "trials of suspicion"  (daʿsawī al-tuḥam) where defendants could be convicted without witnesses or documentary proof.

Henri Laoust said that Ibn Taymiyyah never propagated the idea of a single caliphate but believed the Muslim ummah or community would form into a confederation of states. Laoust further stated that Ibn Taymiyyah called for obedience only to God, and the Islamic prophet Muhammad, and he did not put a limit on the number of leaders a Muslim community could have. However Mona Hassan, in her recent study of the political thoughts of Ibn Taymiyyah, questions this and says Laoust has wrongly claimed that Ibn Taymiyyah thought of the caliphate as a redundant idea. Hassan has shown that Ibn Taymiyyah considered the Caliphate that was under the Rashidun Caliphs; Abu Bakr, Umar, Uthman, and Ali, as the moral and legal ideal. The Caliphate in his view could not be ceded "in favour of secular kingship (mulk).

Jihad 

Ibn Taymiyyah was noted for his emphasis on the importance of jihad and for the "careful and lengthy attention" he gave "to the questions of martyrdom" in jihad, such as benefits and blessings to be had for martyrs in the afterlife. Alongside his disciple Ibn Kathir, Ibn Taymiyya is widely regarded as one of the most influential classical theoreticians of armed Jihad. Ibn Taymiyya believed that martyrdom in Jihad grants eternal rewards and blessings. He wrote that, "It is in jihad that one can live and die in ultimate happiness, both in this world and in the Hereafter. Abandoning it means losing entirely or partially both kinds of happiness."

He defined jihad as:

It comprehends all sorts of worship, whether inward or outward, including love for Allah, being sincere to Him, relying on Him, relinquishing one's soul and property for His sake, being patient and austere, and keeping remembrance of Almighty Allah. It includes what is done by physical power, what is done by the heart, what is done by the tongue through calling to the way of Allah by means of authoritative proofs and providing opinions, and what is done through management, industry, and wealth.

He gave a broad definition of what constituted "aggression" against Muslims and what actions by non-believers made jihad against them permissible. He declared

It is allowed to fight people for (not observing) unambiguous and generally recognized obligations and prohibitions, until they undertake to perform the explicitly prescribed prayers, to pay zakat, to fast during the month of Ramadan, to make the pilgrimage to Mecca and to avoid what is prohibited, such as marrying women in spite of legal impediments, eating impure things, acting unlawfully against the lives and properties of Muslims and the like. It is obligatory to take the initiative in fighting those people, as soon as the prophet's summons with the reasons for which they are fought has reached them. But if they first attack the Muslims then fighting them is even more urgent, as we have mentioned when dealing with the fighting against rebellious and aggressive bandits.

In the modern context, his rulings have been used by some Islamist groups to declare jihad against various governments.

On Martyrdom Operations (Inghimas) 

Ibn Taymiyya was a major proponent of a form of Martyrdom operations during Jihad known as ''inghimas'' (plunging into the enemy). Although suicide is considered sinful in traditional Islamic law, Ibn Taymiyya distinguished between inghimas and suicide, asserting that the former is Martyrdom. Ibn Taymiyya sanctioned the act of plunging into the armies of non-Muslims even if the Muslim fighter or fighters are certain that they will be killed; as long as it benefited Islam for the purpose of Jihad. Ibn Taymiyya argued that inghimas were sanctioned in three battlefield scenarios:

 When a Muslim soldier charges individually into a large army of non-Muslims in such a way that he gets overwhelmed by them
 When a Muslim soldier undertakes a mission to assassinate the commander of disbelievers, even if it is certain that he may get killed
 When a Muslim soldier remains to fight the enemy armies alone, even after retreat and defeat

Ibn Taymiyya praised inghimas as a part of the religious command to wage Jihad and attain Shuhada (martyrdom) in battlefield. Furthermore, he asserted that the practice was mainstream during the era of Muhammad and the companions. In support of his stances, Ibn Taymiyya refers to the Qurʾānic story of the People of the Ditch; writing
 "In the story [of the Companions of the Pit] the young boy is ordered to get himself killed to manifest religion's splendor. For this reason the four imams have permitted a Muslim to plunge into the ranks of the unbelievers, even if he thinks they will kill him, on condition that this [act] is in the interest of Muslims."
Apart from Inghimasi, Ibn Taymiyya also issued legal verdicts sanctioning the killing of Muslim civilians who are employed as "human shields" by the enemy armies, a tactic frequently used by the Mongols, but only if the Muslim army had no other choice. In Ibn Taymiyya's view, Muslims killed in such operations are to be honoured as shuhada (martyrs) and such tactics are justifiable since the benefits exceed its detriments. In the modern-era, various Jihadist ideologues have exploited Ibn Taymiyya's fatwas for inghimasi operations to justify Suicide Bombings as martyrdom. In retaliation to the Jyllands-Posten Muhammad cartoons controversy, Al-Qaeda conducted the 2008 Danish Embassy suicide bombing in Islamabad, based on Ibn Taymiyya's works. Directly quoting from Ibn Taymiyya's extracts, Islamic State (IS) would launch large-scale inghimasi operations as a novel terror tactic of suicide bombings during its 2014 insurgency across Iraq and Syria. Scholars like Rebecca Molfoy have disputed this view, asserting that Ibn Taymiyya did not legalise mass-murder of non-combatants, but sanctioned inghimasi only in battlefield, when outnumbered and when it was beneficial to Islam. According to Molfoy, unlike suicide bombings which necessitate taking one's own life, Ibn Taymiyya held that it was possible to come out alive after Inghimasi operations, even while glorifying martyrdom.

Innovation (Bidʿah) 

Even though Ibn Taymiyyah has been called a theologian, he claimed to reject ʿIlm al-Kalam, known as Islamic theology, as well as some aspects of Sufism and Peripatetic philosophy, as an innovation (Bid'ah). Despite this, Ibn Taymiyyah's works contained numerous arguments that openly refer to rational arguments (kalam) for their validity and therefore he is included by some scholars as amongst the Mutakallimin.

On the other hand, Ibn Taymiyya has also been regarded by various scholars as "a literalist and reactionary" and as the "thirteenth-century scourge of reason", who saw it as his mission to purify Islam of all inauthentic outgrowths and return to the purity of Muhammad's time. Islam, in the eyes of Ibn Taymiyya, was to adhere strictly to the Qur’an, Hadith, and the practices and interpretations of the salaf – a view Ibn Taymiyya called madhhab al-salaf or ‘the doctrine of the predecessors’. Any idea not found in these fundamental sources was bid‘a, reprehensible innovations to pristine Islam. He engaged in fierce debates against Ash'arite scholars and denounced the rationalist Qur'anic commentary of Ash'arite theologian Fakhr al-Din al-Razi, as a heresy that altered the meaning of Scriptures. According to Ibn Taymiyya, philosophically minded Ash‘ari theologians like Al-Razi were "innovators who prefer the pseudo -philosophical approach of recent ages", rather than the approach of the Salaf.

Ibn Taymiyyah opposed giving any undue religious honors to mosques (even that of Jerusalem, the Masjid Al-Aqsa), to approach or rival in any way the Islamic sanctity of the two most holy mosques within Islam, Masjid al-Haram (in Mecca) and Al-Masjid al-Nabawi (in Madina). As for the practice of making journey for the sole purpose of visiting a mosque, Ibn Taymiyyah stated in his books; Majmuʿat al-Rasaʾil al-Kubra, Minhaj al-Sunna and Majmuʿat Fatawa, that, "Journey must not be made except to three mosques; Masjid al-Haram, Masjid al-Nabawi and Masjid Al-Aqsa". Regarding this Serajul Haque says that, "In the opinion of Ibn Taymiyyah only these three mosques have been accepted by the Prophet as the object of journeys, on account of their excellence over all other mosques and places of prayer. Ibn Taymiyyah uses a saying (hadith) of the Islamic prophet Muhammad in Bukhari and Muslim to justify his view that it is not permitted to journey exclusively to any mosque other than the sacred mosques in Mecca, Medina, or Jerusalem.

Existence of saints
Although it is sometimes supposed that Ibn Taymiyyah rejected the very idea of saints, which had become a cardinal Sunni belief in the medieval period, scholarship has shown that this is not true. Nevertheless, it's important to note that the term saint (wali) in Islam is not equal to the Catholic definition of it. Saint in islamic theology designates righteous people from the past, who became well-known for their piety. There is, though, no process of canonization or veneration of icons, which is strongly condemned in Islam as violations of the basic monotheism. Indeed, while Ibn Taymiyyah did indeed reject widely-established orthodox practices associated with the veneration of saints in Islam at his time, like the visitation to their graves and the seeking of their intercession, he never rejected the actual existence of saints as such. On the contrary, he explicitly states: "The miracles of saints are absolutely true and correct, by the acceptance of all Muslim scholars. And the Qur'an has pointed to it in different places, and the sayings of Muhammad have mentioned it, and whoever denies the miraculous power of saints are only people who are innovators and their followers." In this particular respect, he differed little from all his contemporaries; for just as practically all of the era's scholars believed that "the lives of saints and their miracles were incontestable", so also did Ibn Taymiyyah.

Ibn Taymiyyah's most categorical declaration of accepting the existence of saints and their miracles appears in his famous creed 'Aqīda al-Wāsitīya, in which he states: "Among the fundamentals of the belief of the People of the Sunna is belief in the miracles of the saints (karāmāt al-awliyā) and the supernatural acts which God achieves through them in all varieties of knowledge, illuminations (mukāshafāt), power, and impressions as it is handed down about the ancient nations in the chapter of the Cave and in other Quranic chapters and is known of the early men among this Community of Believers among the Companions and Followers and the rest of the generations of this Community of Believers. It [the blessing of having saints and saintly miracles] will be with them until the Day of Resurrection."

Visitation of the tombs of the prophets and the saints (Ziyarah)

Ibn Taymiyyah considered the visitation of the tombs of prophets and saints as impermissible, a blameworthy innovation and comparable to worshiping something besides God (shirk). His pilgrimage (Hajj) to the city of Mecca in 1293 motivated Ibn Taymiyya to compile the treatise Manasik al-Hajj wherein he harshly attacked the practice of travelling to visit Muhammad's grave as a bid'ah (religious innovation). In Ibn Taymiyya's view, if early Muslims did not visit Muhammad's grave, and especially if Muhammad forbade the visiting of his grave as a religious ritual; then doing so would be an innovation as per Islamic teachings. According to Ibn Taymiyya, all religious journeys with the purpose of visiting other than the three mosques of Mecca, Medina and Jerusalem are prohibited. This includes even Muhammad's grave in Medina. Although a person staying in Medina may visit Muhammad's grave, Ibn Taymiyya argues, this cannot be its purpose.

Nevertheless, Ibn Taymiyya did not condemn ziyara in its entirety and affirms a form of ziyāra that aligned with his reading of the salaf; which did not place the dead between the believer and God. Ibn Taymiyya categorised unlawful grave-visits into three distinct types. One category was the practice in which a person travels to a grave, invokes God directly yet includes the name of saint in that supplication directed to God as part of Tawassul. Ibn Taymiyya dismisses this as unlawful innovation but does not label it as shirk (polytheism). The second category of unlawful ziyāra involves visiting graves with the purpose of seeking the intercession (Shafa'a) of the dead with God. Ibn Taymiyya strongly condemned this as shirk and compared it to the Meccan opponents of the Muhammad, writing:"If he says, “I ask him so that he may intercede with God for me, because he is closer to God than me. And I seek a means to God through him, just as a means to the ruler is sought through his special counsel and helpers’ – this is from the actions of the mushrikūn and Christians, for they claim to take priests and rabbis as intercessors, who intercede for them in their requests, and God informs us of the mushrikūn that they said, "We do not worship them except that they bring us closer to God." (Q 39:3)

The type of grave-visits which Ibn Taymiyya considered as the most heinous form of shirk and condemned most harshly were the ones involving direct supplication to the dead. Excommunicating those who practised this as apostates and calling for their execution, Ibn Taymiyya writes:"As for the one who comes to a grave of a prophet or a righteous person and asks his need from him such as asking him to end his illness…or fulfil his debt, or take vengeance from his enemy, or to heal him, his family or his beast and what is like this, from those matters that none but God, the Mighty and Majestic has power over, then this is clear shirk (shirk sarīḥ), it is obligatory that his repentance be sought, or he is (to be) killed."

Ibn Taymiyya's views on Ziyara would be vigorously rejected by those Sunni scholars who opposed his views both during his life and after his death. The Shafi'i scholar Ibn Hajar al-Asqalani stated that "This is one of the ugliest positions that has been reported of Ibn Taymiyya" and also added that travelling to visit the tomb of Muhammad was "one of the best of actions and the noblest of pious deeds with which one draws near to God, and its legitimacy is a matter of consensus." The Hanafi hadith scholar Ali al-Qari stated that, "Amongst the Hanbalis, Ibn Taymiyya has gone to an extreme by prohibiting travelling to visit the Prophet – may God bless him and grant him peace" Qastallani stated that "The Shaykh Taqi al-Din Ibn Taymiyya has abominable and odd statements on this issue to the effect that travelling to visit the Prophet is prohibited and is not a pious deed." Other scholars in opposition to Ibn Taymiyyah's views include Ghazali, Nawawi, Munawi and Qadi Ayyad who stated that visiting Muhammad was "a sunna of the Muslims on which there was consensus, and a good and desirable deed."

Intercession
Ibn Taymiyya became the most influential stalwart of a critical trend of Islamic thought which rejected ideas associated with saint-cults, beliefs in intercession, the sanctity of saints’ relics, veneration of graves, etc. He is widely regarded as one of the most astute and formidable opponents of beliefs and practices associated with saint veneration in Islamic scholarship. Scholars like Yahya Michot draw an anology of Ibn Taymiyya's views with Protestant attacks on Catholic "idolatry". German scholar of Islam Marco schoeller compared the treatises of Ibn Taymiyya to that of the 16th century European Protestant theologian John Calvin. Ibn Taymiyyah had advocated an extensive theological doctrine that aimed to upheld Tawhid by prohibiting bid’a (innovations). Various beliefs and acts Ibn Taymiyyah considered as religious innovations and/or shirk included setting up intermediaries between God and creation, seeking intercession from anything other than God, visiting shrines, metaphorical interpretations of the Qur’an, veneration of creation, ruling by non-Islamic laws, denying Divine Attributes, etc. One of the core teachings espoused by Ibn Taymiyyah was that the original polytheists during Jahiliyya (pre-Islamic era) had not associated their deities with God in all aspects. Rather, they acknowledged God as their Supreme Lord and Creator but associated their deities with God in terms of love and veneration.

Ibn Taymiyyah believed that seeking the assistance of God through intercession is allowed, as long as the other person is still alive. However, he believed that those who seek assistance from the graves of the Prophet or saints, are mushrikin (polytheists), someone who is engaged in shirk. Ibn Taymiyya's vehement denunciation of intercession, saint-veneration, cult of saints, etc. were based on his conception of worship (‘Ibāda), which included a broad range of religious practices. According to Ibn Taymiyya, Worship includes acts such as sacrificial offerings, fasting, praying, supplications (du‘ā’), etc. The practice of supplication (du‘ā’) was significant; since both Ibn Taymiyya and Ibn Qayyim labelled du‘ā’ to be the "essence of worship" (mukhkh al-‘ibāda). Declaring Takfir (Excommunication) upon those people who adhered to these practices, Ibn Taymiyya states:"Requesting healing from illness, or the wellbeing of the family, or deliverance from adversity in this world and the hereafter, or victory over one’s enemy, or guidance of the heart, or forgiveness of sins, or entry into heaven or deliverance from hell… it is only permissible to request this from God alone. It is not permissible to say to a King, prophet or shaykh – living or dead – ‘forgive my sins’… and other things like that. Whoever asks this from a created being is a mushrik with his Lord."

This view was also vigorously rejected by his Sunni opponents who dominated the contemporary religious scholarship. For example, the chief judge of Damascus, Taqi al-Din al-Subki stated that, "It is proper to entreat and ask for the help and intercession of the Prophet ﷺ with God. No one from amongst the salaf and khalaf denied this, until Ibn Taymiyya came along and disapproved of this, and deviated from the straight path, and invented a position that no scholar has said before, and he became a deterrent example for Muslims". Similarly, Ibn Hajar al-Haytami rejected Ibn Taymiyya's view on intercession and held that he had broken with the established consensus of Sunni scholars, as did many other scholars such as Zurqani and Khalil ibn Ishaq.

On the other hand, Ibn Taymiyya firmly upheld his views -which he regarded as the orthodox Sunni position- as religiously indisputable and quoted a scholarly consensus (Ijma) in support of his beliefs:"Whoever seeks aid from the one who is deceased or absent human being, such that he calls upon him during difficulues and times of hardship and asks to fulfill his needs by saying 'Oh my master so and so' seeking help and aid in removing hardship, or he says when the enemy attacks him: 'Oh my master so and so', appealing to him or he says this when he is sick, poor, and needing other things – such a person is misguided, ignorant, mushrik and disobedient to God by the consensus of Muslims; for they agree that the dead is not called upon and nothing is required of him, whether he is a prophet, a sheikh, or otherwise"

Mutakallimun 

The mutakallimun are scholars who engage in ilm al-Kalam (speculative theology) and they were criticised by Ibn Taymiyyah for their use of rationalist theology and philosophy. Ibn Taymiyya was heavily hostile to Kalam and believed it to be amongst the most severe religious innovations that emerged after the first three generations. He asserted that the method of kalam was used by the Mu`tazilites, Jahmites and Ash`ari's. Ibn Taymiyyah considered the use of philosophical proofs and kalam to be redundant because he saw the Qur'an and the Sunna as superior rational proofs. Ibn Taymiyyah argued that these explanations were not grounded in scriptural evidence such as the philosophical explanation of the divine attributes of God or the proof of God using the cosmological argument. He said that the call to Islam was not made using such methods by the Qur'an or Muhammad and that these theories have only caused errors and corruption. The mutakallimun called their use of rationalist theology "Usul al-Din" (principles of religion) but Ibn Taymiyyah said that the use of rationalist theology has nothing to do with the true usul al-din which comes from God and to state otherwise is to say that Muhammad neglected an important aspect of Islam. Ibn Taymiyyah says that the usul al-din of the mutakallimun, deserve to be named usul din al-shaytan (principles of Satanic religion).

Ibn Taymiyya condemned many aspects of the evolving jurisprudential sciences as "educated conjectures"; particularly the impact of Kalam theology on 'ilm al-Ikhtilaf (science of scholarly differences) as well as on Usul al-Fiqh (principles of juriamsprudence).  For Ibn Taymiyya, Shari'a (Islamic law) is characterised by certainty and stability. In cases of absence of clear Scriptural texts; Ijtihad is to be exercised based on Scriptures rather than Taqlid (blind following) to past juristic opinions. Ibn Taymiyya attributed the flood of numerous juristic opinions, prevalence of controversial views and their resultant instability on the approach of speculative theologians who regarded Fiqh (jurisprudence) as a science of "conjectures". Blaming the jurists of speculative principles, especially those of the Hanafite school for the decline of Fiqh sciences; Ibn Taymiyya writes:"[they] do not provide for God any definite rule. In fact, they go so far as making a category of distinctions between a master-jurist (mujtahid) who is correct and one who is wrong. Rather the legal rule (hukm) for every person is whatever his intellectual exertion leads him to... [the theologians] excluded positive law (fiqh), which  all the [religious] sciences, from the discourse of science itself; on the basis of what they observed in terms of following authority (taqlid) and conjectural propositions.. jurists who rely on sharia texts (ahl al-nusus) [instead of speculation] are far move capable of giving [correct] juridicial responses and are more beneficial to Muslims than the people of opinion (Ahl al-Ra'y) . . . This is because to solve real-life activities, Muslims need to know the source texts (nusus)"

Ibn Taymiyyah was a major proponent of the doctrines of the early generations (Salaf al-Salih), which he held to be pristine Islam and advocated the re-generation of their beliefs and practices. He was a zealous opponent of Ash'arite Kalam, condemning it as a philosophical outgrowth that corrupted the purity of early Islamic tenets. Ibn Taymiyya challenged Ash'arite theologian Ghazali's epistimolegical discourse which emphasized linguistic and figurative (majaz) analysis, instead advocating Scriptural literalism based on contextual intrapolation. Ibn Taymiyya categorised Ash'arites alongside heterodox sects like Kharijites, Mu'tazilites, Jahmites, Shi'ites, etc. that separated from Sunni orthodoxy. In spite of his exclusivist positions, Ibn Taymiyya held that all those sects are not to be excommunicated, except for Jahmites and extreme Shi'ites. Ibn Taymiyyah's attempts to focus attention onto Qur'anic rationality was taken up by his student Ibn Qayyim, to the exception of his other followers. This focus on traditionlist rationlism was also taken up by Musa Bigiev.

Despite his critical stance, one of Ibn Taymiyyah's last direct students, Ibn Qadi al-Jabal (d. 1370), says that "Ibn Taymiyya used to praise the expansiveness of al-Ash'ari’s knowledge and would quote the latter’s works by memory in public lessons (al-majalis al-a'mma), in particular al-Iba'na", that he talked highly of later Ash'ari scholars like Al-Baqillani and Al-Juwayni and as for Al-Ghazali, having studied his books with Ibn Taymiyyah, he says that "Ibn Taymiyyah told those present how impressed he was by al-Ghazali’s eloquence and the extent of his knowledge."

Sufism 
Some scholars argue that Ibn Taymiyyah belonged to the Qadiriyya tariqa (order) of Sufism and claimed to inherit the khirqa (spiritual mantle) of the founder of the Qadiriyya order 'Abd al-Qadir al-Jilani.
Among his explicit positive references to Sufism and the Qadiriyya tariqa in particular, Ibn Taymiyyah referred to Jilani as "Shaykhuna" (our Shaykh) and "Sayyidi" (my master). He spoke highly of a great many other Sufi Shaykhs also such as Abu Yazid al-Bistami and al-Junayd, and went to great lengths to state that Sufism is not a heretical innovation (bid'ah). However, authors like Fritz Meier and Thomas Michel contend that such reports and traditions attributed to Ibn Taymiyya does not prove that he was a member formally affiliated to any Sufi Tariqa.

Gibril Haddad, a contemporary Naqshbandi Sufi scholar and critic of Ibn Taymiyyah's doctrinal positions, argues that "insofar as the goal of tasawwuf is the purification of the heart by progress through states (ahwal) and stations (maqamat), Ibn Taymiyya in al-Tuhfat al-'Iraqiyya (al-Zarqa’ Jordan 1978, p. 18) imitated Imam al-Ghazali's fatwa in al-Munqidh min al-Dalal in considering tasawwuf obligatory upon every Muslim, naming it a'mal al-qulub." Scholar Arjan Post, in the introduction to the edition and English translation of Risālat al-sulūk (Epistle on the Spiritual Way) by al-Baʿlabakkī (d. 734/1333), a Lebanon-born Hanbali Sufi and direct student of Ibn Taymiyyah, talks of a "Sufi circle" among his students, notably through ʿImād al-Dīn Aḥmad al-Wāsiṭī, who "fulfilled the role of Sufi shaykh in the Taymiyyan circle until he passed away in 711/1311", and who was appreciated by other famous direct or indirect students of Ibn Taymiyyah who became famous scholars, notably Ibn Qayyim Al-Jawziyya, Ibn Rajab and Al-Dhahabi. Although Ibn Taymiyyah was critical of some of the developments within Sufism, he never rejected the practice outright, and actually enumerated a list of early Sufis whom he considered to be among the greatest Islamic saints. In this list, he included Bayazid Bastami, Junayd of Baghdad, Abdul-Qadir Gilani, Hasan of Basra, Ibrahim ibn Adham, Maruf Karkhi, Sirri Saqti, and several other venerable personages who have always been venerated in mainstream Sunni Islam as being among the greatest saints of all.

An alternate view shared by many scholars and critics assert that Ibn Taymiyyah totally rejected Sufism, both exclusively, as well as the general concept of Sufism. Scholars and researchers who propound this view argue that the notion of Ibn Taymiyyah's alleged support towards Sufism were based on misinterpretations of his Fatwas (legal verdicts). The words of Ibn Taymiyyah in praise of 'Abd al-Qadir Gilani were simply respect of the latter in the scope of scholarly position, not the mystical cult of personality or saint-veneration towards Gilani practiced by the Qadiryya order, which in effect also includes the view of Ibn Qayyim al-Jawziyya's hostile view towards Tariqa orders. This view of Ibn Taymiyyah's total rejection of Sufism and Tariqa concept of Mysticism were also supported by the Puritans during the era of Ottoman Empire. According to Hamud at Tuwaijir, a Hadith scholar, this view alone caused Ibn Taymiyyah, and by extension, Ibn al Qayyim, and his spiritual successor, Muhammad ibn 'Abd al-Wahhab, being reviled so much by some of the communities that supported Sufism, such as Tablighi Jamaat.

In particular, Ibn Taymiyyah rejected two views associated with some extreme Sufis. He rejected the veneration of saints who promulgated Ibn Arabi's doctrines of wahdat al-wajud. Firstly, he rejected monism which he believed was similar to the pantheistic belief that God "encompasses all things". Secondly, he asserted that the view that spiritual enlightenment is of a greater importance than obeying the sharia was a failure to properly follow the example of Muhammad. On Ibn 'Arabi, and Sufism in general, Henri Laoust says that Ibn Taymiyyah never condemned Sufism in and of itself, but only that which he considered to be inadmissible deviations in doctrine, ritual or morals, such as monism, antinomianism or esotericism. However, scholar Jamileh Kadivar has reported that Ibn Taymiyyah issued blatant takfir (excommunication from Islam) on Ibn 'Arabi. This view was also supported by the official scholars committee from Imam Mohammad Ibn Saud Islamic University, who issued a formal Fatwa (legal verdict) maintaining that Ibn Taymiyyah rejected any form of Sufism, whether they are structural, such as Tariqa order, or non-structural, individual practice of Sufism. The fatwa also covered the speculation of him belonging to the Qadiriyya order; stating that it was a fabrication.

Furthermore, there had also been numerous incidents wherein Ibn Taymiyya physically confronted Sufis. In 1301, Ibn Taymiyya had accompanied the Mamluk army in its campaigns against the Shia inhabitants of Kasrawan town. After expelling the non-Sunni inhabitants of the town, Ibn Taymiyya returned to Syria to attack the Sufi Ahmadiyya Rifawiyyan order of Damascus; accusing them of "Mongol sympathies". After 1305, there would be a dramatic escalation in confrontations between Ibn Taymiyya and popular folk expressions of religion associated with Sufism. In one such incident, Taymiyyah would personally lead stonemasons and demolish a structure in the Naranja Mosque to physically prevent Sufi veneration of a popular religious site. Disparaging the various mystical and devotional exercises of the practitioners of esoteric Sufism, Ibn Taymiyya argued that such rituals only enable Satan to possess their empty minds and corrupt their souls.

Ibn Taymiyya vehemently denounced the doctrines of the Sufi masters Muhyiddun Ibn ‘Arabī (d. 1240), Al-Qunawi, Ibn Sab'in, etc. who had advocated the concept of waḥdat al-wujūd (Unity of Existence). Ibn Taymiyya believed that the emergence of Sufi pantheist doctrines heralded the coming of Masih ad-Dajjal (Anti-christ), blaming it as the main reason for the Tatar invasions and the ensuing dismantlement of Sharia (Islamic law). Condemning Ibn 'Arabi and his followers as a greater danger than the Mongol invasions itself, Ibn Taymiyya writes:"Opposing (by word or deed) these (proponents of waḥdat al-wujūd) is the greatest of religious obligations, for they have corrupted intellects and creeds of the people, including Shaykhs, scholars and rulers…their harm is greater in religion than harm of the one who corrupts the worldly affairs of the Muslims but leaves their religion untouched, such as the bandit of the Mongols who take away people’s wealth but leave alone their religion."

Ibn Taymiyya was also known for his critique of influential Asharite theologian Abu Hamid al-Ghazali (d. 1111 C.E/ 505 A.H), whom he accused of being deviated from authentic Sunnism, over his choice of embracing the Sufi path. On Ghazali's forsaking of Kalam, Esotericism, Philosophy, etc. and eventual embracal of the Sufi path, Ibn Taymiyya writes:"he [Ghazali] soon discovered by means of his intelligence and devout inquiry, that the method of the theologians and philosophers was incoherent. .. so he began search for the exposition [of this faith]. Then he discovered in the discourses of Sufi shaykhs that which was nearer to the truth and more reasonable than what the theologians and philosophers had to offer... But, he did not gain access to the prophetic heritage, namely the sciences and spiritual states possessed by the elect of the community. Nor did he attain the proper knowledge and devotion achieved by the earliest generations and the forerunners [of the community]. [Both these groups] attained so much by way of cognitive discoveries and practical modes of service to God which those others [i.e. theologians, philosophers and Sufis] never attained. Hence, he [al-Ghazali] began to believe that the exposition of his concise faith could be obtained only through the [Sufi] way, since he knew no other path. [This happened] because the special path of the elevated prophetic example remained closed to him."

Shi'a Islam 

Ibn Taymiyyah was a proponent of the doctrine of Takfir (excommunication) on many Muslims across various Islamic sects such as the Mu'tazilites, the Shi'i Muslims, Sufi mystics like Ibn 'Arabi, etc. ; declaring them as apostates based on his religious interpretations. In particular, Ibn Taymiyyah was extremely critical of Shi'ism and considered its adherents to be religiously bankrupt, among the most morally depraved people and the root cause of many ills plaguing the Muslim World. His severe critique of Twelver Shia in his book, Minhaj as-Sunnah an-Nabawiyyah, was written in response to the book Minhaj al-karama fi ma'rifat al-imama, by the Shia theologian Al-Hilli. Much of his criticisms tended to emphasise the similarities between Shi'ites, Christians and Jews. Ibn Taymiyyah also wrote comprehensive refutations of the Twelver doctrine of Imamah and much of his works serve as an influential source for Sunni anti-Shi'te polemics to this day.

Among other things, he accused Shia (who he often referred to as rafidha or rejectionists) of helping non-Muslim enemies against Muslims
Many of the rafidha (rejectionists) would favor the infidels within his heart more than he would favor the Muslims. That is why when the infidel Turks emerged from the east and fought the Muslims and spilled their blood, in the lands of Khurasan and in Iraq and Sham and in the Peninsula and elsewhere, the rafidha were there to aid them in killing Muslims. And the Baghdad vizier known as Al-’Alqami; it was he and others like him who greatly aided them against the Muslims, as well as those who were in Al-Sham’s Aleppo and other rafidha who were the fiercest collaborators in fighting Muslims. The same goes for the Christians (the Crusaders) in Al-Sham where the rafidha were their greatest helpers. And should the Jews get a state in Iraq or elsewhere, the rafidha will be their greatest helpers, for they are always supportive of the infidels whether they are idolaters or Jews or Christians...

Regarding the Shia mourning for Husayn on Ashura, Ibn Taymiyyah considered Husayn's martyrdom as a divinely bestowed honour—not a major tragedy. He also argued that such mourning was never instructed by Muhammad and that the Islamic response to recent (let alone ancient) loss is not extravagant mourning but to endure the loss with patience and trust in God. However, he also believed those who celebrated on Ashura were anti-Shia zealots ("an-Nāṣibiyyah") or ignorant people.

Fathi Shaqaqi, the Sunni Islamist inspired by the Islamic revolution of Iran who founded the Islamic Jihad Movement in Palestine, said that Ibn Taymiyyah didn't consider Twelver Shi'as, that is the majority of the Shi'as, to be heretics, but mainly sects like the Ismailis, also precising that the geopolitical context of the day played a role in his thinking, and that, among Sunni scholars, "fatwas such as his were not disseminated, despite the fact that the Shi‘a had by then been in existence for some 600 years."

Abu Muhammad al-Maqdisi, one of the most influential modern jihadi ideologues, bases himself on Ibn Taymiyyah to say that the laypeople among the Shi'as are not to be considered disbelievers. Ibn Taymiyya's relentless polemics against Shiism consolidated the orthodox Sunni anti-Shia stances and has influenced numerous Sunni scholars, intellectuals and Islamist ideologues.

Christianity 

Ibn Taymiyyah wrote polemics against Christians. His work Al-Jawāb al-Ṣaḥīḥ li-man baddala dīn al-Masīh is a detailed refutation of Christian Doctrine. He also held extreme anti-Christian views and enmity. He also discounts the Christians' role in early Islamic history and views interfaith commonality as a luxury, giving an ideological justification to declare unrestricted war on Christians and Jews. Meanwhile, in what a number of modern scholars have seen as the golden age of Christian Arabic literature, Arab speaking Christian scholars wrote extensive theological treaties in Arabic in which they not only responded to the polemics of their Muslim advertiser but they also provided systematic, summary discussions of Christian faith and practice.

Ibn Taymiyyah issued a fatwa prohibited Muslims to participate and greeting Christians on their religious events and celebrations or to imitate them, he said in Majmoo‘ al-Fataawa (2/488): "It is not permissible for the Muslims to imitate them [ Christians ] in any way that is unique to their festivals, whether it be food, clothes, bathing, lighting fires or refraining from usual work or worship, and so on. And it is not permissible to give a feast or to exchange gifts or to sell things that help them to celebrate their festivals, or to let children and others play the games that are played on their festivals, or to adorn oneself or put up decorations".

An example of Ibn Taymiyyah use of his interpretation was in defense of the (temporary) closing of all Christian churches in 1299 in the Mamluk Sultanate. The closing was in violation of a 600-year-old covenant with Christian dhimmis known as the Pact of Umar. But as Ibn Taymiyyah pointed out, while venerable, the pact was written 60 years or so after the time of the companions and so had no legal effect. Ibn Taymiyyah also suggested that Jews and Christians should be confined to their own specific regions.

Druze 
Ibn Taymiyya dismissed the Druze as non-Muslims, and his fatwa cited that Druzes: "Are not at the level of ′Ahl al-Kitāb (People of the Book) nor mushrikin (polytheists). Rather, they are from the most deviant kuffār (Infidel) ... Their women can be taken as slaves and their property can be seized ... they are to be killed whenever they are found and cursed as they described ... It is obligatory to kill their scholars and religious figures so that they do not misguide others", which in that setting would have legitimized violence against them as apostates. Ibn Taymiyyah believed that Druze have a high level of infidelity, besides being apostates. Thus, they are not trustworthy and should not be forgiven. He teaches also that Muslims cannot accept Druze penitence nor keep them alive, and Druze property should be confiscated, and their women enslaved. Mamluk and Ottoman sultans have often relied on Ibn Taymiyya religious ruling to justify their persecution of Druze, and calling for jihad against the Druze.

Alawites 
Ibn Taymiyyah pointed out that the Alawites were not Shi'ites because they were heretics and therefore they were outside Islam, arguably, he was the most virulently anti-Alawite in his fatwas where he ruled that the Alawites "are more infidel than Jews or Christians, even more infidel than many polytheists. They have done greater harm to the community of Muhammad than have the warring infidels such as the Franks, the Turks, and others. To ignorant Muslims they pretend to be Shi’is, though in reality they do not believe in God or his prophet or his book…Whenever possible, they spill the blood of Muslims…They are always the worst enemies of the Muslims…war and punishment in accordance with Islamic law against them are among the greatest of pious deeds and the most important obligations".

Non-Muslims 
Ibn Taymiyyah strongly opposed borrowing from Christianity or other non-Muslim religions. In his text On the Necessity of the Straight Path (kitab iqtida al-sirat al-mustaqim) he preached that the beginning of Muslim life was the point at which "a perfect dissimilarity with the non-Muslims has been achieved." To this end he opposed the celebration of the observance of the birthday of the Islamic prophet Muhammad or the construction of mosques around the tombs of Muslim saints saying: "Many of them (the Muslims) do not even know of the Christian origins of these practices."

Economic views 
He elaborated a circumstantial analysis of market mechanism, with a theoretical insight unusual in his time. Regarding the power of supply and demand, Ibn Taymiyyah said, "If desire for goods increases while its availability decreases, its price rises. On the other hand, if availability of the good increases and the desire for it decreases, the price comes down." His discourses on the welfare advantages and disadvantages of market regulation and deregulation, have an almost contemporary ring to them.

However, he also advocated a policy of "fair prices" and "fair profits", with the implication that anything higher would be impious. Such forms of price fixing was detrimental to entrepreneurship. He argued that trade and commerce should be conducted in a fair and just manner, and that individuals had a responsibility to treat their customers and business partners with honesty and integrity. He believed that the principles of Islamic economics were designed to promote economic growth and prosperity while ensuring social justice and fairness.

Eternity of species
He argued that there was an alternate view to the view which was held by philosophers, like Ibn Sina, who claimed that the universe was eternal in its entirety, and Islamic scholars, like Fakhr al-Din al-Razi, who claimed that the universe was created from nothing by God. In his Sharh Hadith Imran ibn Hasan, Ibn Taymiyya distinguishes between species and elements, asserting that the former are eternal with God. He states: "If it is supposed that the species [of things done] has been with Him from eternity, neither revelation nor reason denies this 'withness' (ma^iyya). On the contrary, it is part of His perfection." In fact, Ibn Taymiyya draws this assertion from his belief that God perpetually creates, i.e. in preeternity. John Hoover, in his Perpetual Creativity In The Perfection Of God: Ibn Taymiyya's Hadith Commentary On God's Creation Of This World, elaborates, "Following in the footsteps of Ibn Sina and Ibn Rushd, Ibn Taymiyya then roots God's perpetual creativity in a Neoplatonic concept of God's perfection. Power and creativity are necessary concomitants of God's perfection. If God's creativity were not perpetual, God would have been devoid of His creativity, as well as other attributes of perfection, in pre-eternity."

Contemporary influence

Salafism 
Ibn Taymiyya's appeals to the precedence of the Qur’an and the Sunna over the authority of the madh'hab system has inspired a wide range of Islamic reform movements over the last few centuries, and especially the Salafiyya reform movement that differ from other Sunnis who adhere to the four legal schools of Fiqh (jurisprudence). These include the 17th century Kadizadeli movement, 18th century Wahhabi movement as well as the Islamic reformist movement of Ibn al-Amīr Al-San’ani (d. 1768) and Muḥammad al-Shawkānī (d. 1834) in Yemen. In the nineteenth century, Taymiyyan tradition would expand across the Islamic World; influencing the Ahl-i Hadith movement in South Asia and the Salafiyya movement in Iraq, Syria and Egypt.

Ibn Taymiyya adamantly insisted that his theological doctrines constituted the original creed of the Salaf, as well as that of Abul Hasan al-Ash'ari; the eponym of the Ash'arite school. He also believed that Sharia (Islamic law) was best preserved through the teachings and practices of the Salaf, the earliest three generations of Muslims. Modern Islamic revivalist movements salute Ibn Taymiyya as "the architect of Salafism", which symbolises the concept of reviving the traditions and values of the Golden Age of the prophet. For Salafiyya movements across the Islamic World, Ibn Taymiyya is their exemplar scholar who revived the methodology of the Salaf, and also a social reformer who defiantly stood against foreign occupation. Today, Salafi Muslims constitute the most avid readers and promoters of the works of Ibn Taymiyya.

Modern Islamism 

Various concepts within modern Islamist movements can be attributed to Ibn Taymiyyah. Ibn Taymiyya is highly revered in contemporary militant Islamist and Jihadist circles for his 1303 Fatwa of Takfir (excommunication) against Mongol Ilkhanate rulers (who were recent converts to Islam) and his assertion that it became obligatory for "true Muslims" to wage Jihad against the apostate Mongol leaders and Muslim citizens who accepted the Yassa code. Influenced by Ibn Taymiyya, Sayyid Qutb would take up Ibn Taymiyya's anti-Mongol fatwa and apply it on contemporary regimes across the Islamic World. Ibn Taymiyya's other major theological mission was to re-assert the primacy of armed jihad in Islamic faith, which played a major role in shaping future militant interpretations of Islam. Along with total, literal adherence to Sharia, he held that waging martial jihad was an Islamic religious obligation for all Muslims, when under foreign invasion. These ideas would be readily embraced in the 20th century by various militant Islamist movements and underpinned the theological justification for militancy of groups like Al-Qaeda, ISIS, etc. Scholars like Yahya Michot have noted that Ibn Taymiyyah "has thus become a sort of forefather of al-Qaeda."

One of main arguments put forth by Ibn Taymiyya was his categorising the world into distinct territories: the domain of Islam (dar al-Islam), where the rule is of Islam and sharia law is enforced; the domain of unbelief (dar-al-kufr) ruled by unbelievers; and the domain of war (dar al-harb) which is territory under the rule of unbelievers who are involved in an active or potential conflict with the domain of Islam. (Ibn Taymiyyah included a fourth. When the Mongols, whom he considered unbelievers, took control of the city of Mardin the population included many Muslims. Believing Mardin was neither the domain of Islam, as Islam was not legally applied with an armed forces consisting of Muslims, nor the domain of war because the inhabitants were Muslim, Ibn Taymiyyah created a new "composite" category, known as dar al-`ahd.) A second concept is making a declaration of apostasy (takfir) against a Muslim who does not obey Islam. But at the same time Ibn Taymiyyah maintained that no one can question anothers faith and curse them as based on one's own desire, because faith is defined by God and the prophet. He said, rather than cursing or condemning them, an approach should be taken where they are educated about the religion.

Another concept attributed to Ibn Taymiyyah is, "the duty to oppose and kill Muslim rulers who do not implement the revealed law (shari'a). Based on this doctrine, Ibn Taymiyya excommunicated the Ilkhanid state for not ruling by Sharia (Islamic law); despite officially professing Islam. Ibn Taymiyya issued various fatwas obliging all Muslims to fight the Mongols; declaring them as mushrikun (polytheists) similar to the people from the age of Jahiliyya (pre-Islamic ignorance). Thus, he is widely regarded as the "spiritual forefather" of the Salafi-Jihadist thought. 20th century Islamist ideologues like Muhammad Rashid Rida, Sayyid Qutb, Abd al Salam Faraj, Usama bin Laden, etc. drew upon these revolutionary ideas to justify armed Jihad against the contemporary nation-states. Ibn Taymiyyah's fatwa on Alawites as "more infidel than Christians and Jews" has been recited by Muslim Brotherhood affiliated scholar Yusuf al-Qaradawi.

Ibn Taymiyyah's role in the Islamist movements of the twentieth and twenty first century have also been noted by the previous Coordinator for Counterterrorism at the United States Department of State, Daniel Benjamin, who labels the chapter on the history of modern Islamic movements in his book The Age of Sacred Terror, as "Ibn Taymiyya and His children". Yossef Rapoport, a reader in Islamic history at Queen Mary, however, says this is not a probable narrative. Ibn Taymiyya's intellectual tradition and ideas such as his emphasis on the revival of pristine ideals and practices of early generations also made an intense impact on the leading ideologue of revolutionary Islamism in South Asia, Sayyid Abul A'la Maududi (1903–1979 C.E/ 1321–1399 A.H).

Mardin fatwas and the Mardin Conference 
One of Ibn Taymiyyah's most famous fatwas are regarding the Mongols who had conquered and destroyed the Abbasid caliphate in 1258 and had then converted to Islam. Once they were in control the town of Mardin, they behaved unjustly with their subjects so the people of Mardin asked Ibn Taymiyyah for a legal verdict regarding the classification of the territory under which they live. He categorized the territory as dar al-`ahd which in some ways is similar to dar al-kufr (domain of unbelievers). Included in his verdict was declaring the Mongol ruler Ghazan and other Mongols who did not accept shari'a in full, as unbelievers. He was also asked whether Muslims living in Mardin had to emigrate (Hijrah) to Islamic territories on account of implementation of man-made laws. Ibn Taymiyya responded in a detailed fatwa: 

According to Nettler and Kéchichian, Ibn Taymiyyah affirmed that Jihad against the Mongols, "was not only permissible but obligatory because the latter ruled not according to Sharīʿah but through their traditional, and therefore manmade, Yassa code. This essentially meant that Mongols were living in a state of jāhilīyah (ignorance)." The authors further state that his two famous students, Ibn Qayyim and Ibn Kathir, agreed with this ruling. He called for a defensive jihad to mobilise the people to kill the Mongol rulers and any one who supported them, Muslim or non-Muslim. Ibn Taymiyyah when talking about those who support the Mongols said, "Everyone who is with them (Mongols) in the state over which they rule has to be regarded as belonging to the most evil class of men. He is either an atheist (zindīq) or a hypocrite who does not believe in the essence of the religion of Islam. This means that he (only) outwardly pretends to be Muslim or he belongs to the worst class of all people who are the people of the bida` (heretical innovations)." Yahya Mochet says that, Ibn Taymiyyah's call to war was not simply to cause a "rebellion against the political power in place" but to repel an "external enemy".

In another series of fatwas, Ibn Taymiyya reiterated the religious obligation of Muslims to fight the Ilkhanids on account of their negligance of Islamic laws. He also took issue with their non-religious approach to dealing with various communities such as Christians, Jews, Budhhists, etc. and employing a large chunk of their armies with non-Muslims. Citing these and various other reasons, Ibn Taymiyya pronounced:

In 2010, a group of Islamic Scholars at the Mardin conference argued that Ibn Taymiyyah's famous fatwa about the residents of Mardin when it was under the control of the Mongols was misprinted into an order to "fight" the people living under their territory, whereas the actual statement is, "The Muslims living therein should be treated according to their rights as Muslims, while the non-Muslims living there outside of the authority of Islamic Law should be treated according to their rights." They have based their understanding on the original manuscript in the Al-Zahiriyah Library, and the transmission by Ibn Taymiyyah's student Ibn Muflih. The participants of the Mardin conference also rejected the categorization of the world into different domains of war and peace, stating that the division was a result of the circumstances at the time. The participants further stated that the division has become irrelevant with the existence of nation states.

Modern reception
Ibn Taymiyya is widely regarded as an anti-rationalist "hater of logic" and a strict literalist who was responsible for the demise of rationalist tendencies within the classical Sunni tradition. Through his polemical treatises such as al-Radd ‘ala al-mantiqiyyın (Refutation of the Rationalists); Ibn Taymiyya zealously denounced syllogism, which provided the rational foundations for both Kalam (speculative theology) and Falsafa.

Scholars like Ignac Goldziher described Ibn Taymiyya as a "Hanbalite zealot" who harshly denounced various practices as bid'ah (religious innovations) and rejected all forms of philosophical influences, speculative theology, Sufism and pantheistic doctrines like Wahdat al-Wujud. According to Lebanese philosopher Majid Fakhry,"Ibn Taymiyah protests against the abuses of philosophy and theology and advocates a return to the orthodox ways of the ancients (al-salaf)... in his religious zeal he is determined to abolish centuries of religious truth as they had been long before they became troubled by theological and philosophical controversies."

Others such as the French scholar Henri Laoust (1905-1983) have argued that such portrayals of Ibn Taymiyyah are flawed inasmuch as they are often borne of a limited reading of the theologian's substantial corpus of works, many of which have not yet been translated from the original Arabic According to Laoust, Ibn Taymiyyah wanted to reform the practice of medieval Sufism as part of his wider aim to reform Sunni Islam (of which Sufism was a major aspect at the time) by divesting both these traditions of what he perceived as heretical innovations within them.

Jamaat-e Islami leader Abdul Haq Ansari contends the ubiquitous notion that Ibn Taymiyyah rejected Sufism outright as erroneous. While "the popular image of Ibn Taymiyyah [is] ... that he [criticized] Sufism indiscriminately ... [was] deadly against the Sufis, and ... [saw] no place for Sufism in Islam," it is historically known, according to the same scholar, that Ibn Taymiyyah actually considered Tasawwuf to be a significant discipline of Islam. "Far from saying [Sufism] has no place in Islam", Ibn Taymiyya was on the whole "sympathetic" towards what everyone at the time considered an important aspect of Islamic life. Various scholars have also asserted that Ibn Taymiyyah had a deep reverence and appreciation for the works of such major Sufi Awliyaa (saints) such as Junayd, Sahl al-Tustari, Abu Talib al-Makki, Bayazid Bastami, etc. , and was part of the Qadiriyya Sufi order himself. Saudi scholar Hatem al-Awni has criticised Ibn Taymiyya over his sectarian discourse against Ash'arite and Maturidite schools as well as his creedal beliefs like three-fold classification of Tawhid (monotheism).

According to James Pavlin, Professor of theology at Rutgers University: "Ibn Taymiyya remains one of the most controversial Islamic thinkers today because of his supposed influence on many fundamentalist movements. The common understanding of his ideas have been filtered through the bits and pieces of his statements that have been misappropriated by alleged supporters and avowed critics alike."

Works 
Ibn Taymiyyah left a considerable body of work, ranging from 350 according to his student Ibn Qayyim Al-Jawziyya to 500 according to his student al-Dhahabi. Oliver Leaman says that Ibn Taymiyyah produced some 700 works in the field of Islamic sciences. His scholarly output has been described as immense with a wide scope and its contents "bear the marks of brilliant insights hastily jotted down". It is the case however, that his works are not yet fully understood but efforts are being made, at least in the western languages to gain an adequate understanding of his writings. In his early life, his work was mostly based on theology and the use of reason in interpretation of scriptural evidences, with later works focusing on; refutation of Greek logic, questioning the prevalent practices of the time, and anti-Christian and anti-Shi'i polemics. Ibn Taymiyyah's total works have not all survived and his extant works of thirty five volumes, are incomplete. The ascendancy of scholastic interest in Ibn Taymiyya’s medieval treatises would recommence through the gradual efforts by 18th century Islamic reform movements. Arab Salafi theologians of Syria, Iraq and Egypt of the late 19th and early 20th centuries would edit, publish and mass-circulate many of his censured manuscripts amongst the Muslim public; making Ibn Taymiyya the most-read classical Islamic theologian in the world. As his scholarly impact gets increased; dissensions and altercations over Ibn Taymiyya's viewpoints continue to escalate.

Extant books and essays 

A Great Compilation of Fatwa (Majmu al-Fatawa al-Kubra or simply Majmu al-Fatawa) This was collected centuries after his death, and contains several of the works mentioned below – Thirty six volumes.
Minhaj as-Sunnah an-Nabawiyyah (The way of the Prophet's Sunna) – Four volumes. In modern critical editions it amounts to more than 2000 pages.
al-Aqidah al-Waasitiyyah (The Creed to the People of Wāsiṭ)
Al-Jawāb al-Ṣaḥīḥ li-man baddala dīn al-Masīh (Literally,"The Correct Response to those who have Corrupted the Deen (Religion) of the Messiah"; A Muslim theologian's response to Christianity) – Seven volumes. In modern critical editions it amounts to more than 2000 pages.
 Darʾ taʿāruḍ al-ʿaql wa al-naql ("Averting the Conflict between Reason and [religious] Tradition"). Also, called Al-Muwāfaqa (Harmony) – Eleven volumes. In modern critical editions it amounts to some 4000 pages.
al-Aqeedah Al-Hamawiyyah (The Creed to the People of Hama, Syria)
al-Asma wa's-Sifaat(Allah's Names and Attributes) – Two volumes
Kitab al Iman (Book of the Tenents of Faith)
Kitāb al-ṣafadiyyah- This book is a refutation of the Philosophers on their claim that the miracles of the Prophet are merely manifestations of the strength of inherent faculties and the claim that the universe is eternal.
as-Sarim al-Maslul 'ala Shatim ar-Rasul—The Drawn Sword against those who insult the Messenger. Written in response to an incident in which Ibn Taymiyyah heard a Christian insulting Muhammad.
Fatawa al-Kubra
Fatawa al-Misriyyah
ar-Radd 'ala al-Mantiqiyyin (The refutation of the Logicians)
Naqd at-Ta'sis (Criticism of incorporation) 
al-Uboodiyyah (The Singling of God in Worship) 
Iqtida' as-Sirat al-Mustaqim' (Following The Straight Path)
al-Siyasa al-shar'iyya(The book of governance according to the shari'a)
Risalah Fil-Ruh wal-Aql
at-Tawassul wal-Waseela
Sharh Futuh al-Ghayb (Commentary on Revelations of the Unseen by Abdul-Qadir Gilani)
al-Hisba fi al-Islam (The Hisba in Islam) – A book on economics

English translations 

The Friends of Allah and the Friends of Shaytan
Kitab al Iman: The Book of Faith
Diseases of the Hearts and their Cures
The Relief from Distress
Fundamentals of Enjoining Good & Forbidding Evil
The Concise Legacy
The Goodly Word
The Madinan Way
Ibn Taymiyya against the Greek logicians
Muslims Under Non-Muslim Rule

Lost works 
Many of Ibn Taymiyyah's books are thought to be lost. Their existence is known through various reports written by scholars throughout history as well as some treatises written by Ibn Taymiyyah. One particularly notable lost work is al-Bahr al-Muhit, Forty volumes tafsir of the Qur'an (written in the prison of Damascus) that Ibn Hajar al`Asqalani mentions the existence of this work in his book, al-Durar al-Kamina.

References

Citations

Sources

 Rapoport, Yossef (April 9, 2010). Ibn Taymiyya and His Times. OUP Pakistan. .
 Hoover, Jon (May 28, 2007). Ibn Taymiyya's Theodicy of Perpetual Optimism. Brill. .

Further reading 

 Little, Donald P. "Did Ibn Taymiyya have a screw loose?", Studia Islamica, 1975, Number 41, pp. 93–111.
 Makdisi, G. "Ibn Taymiyya: A Sufi of the Qadiriya Order", American Journal of Arabic Studies, 1973
 Michot, Yahya. Ibn Taymiyya: Against Extremisms. Texts translated, annotated and introduced. With a foreword by Bruce B. LAWRENCE. Beirut & Paris: Albouraq, 2012, xxxii & 334 p. — .
 Michot, Yahya. Ibn Taymiyya: Muslims under Non-Muslim Rule. Texts translated, annotated and presented in relation to six modern readings of the Mardin fatwa. Foreword by James Piscatori. Oxford & London: Interface Publications, 2006. .
 Michot, Yahya. "Ibn Taymiyya's 'New Mardin Fatwa'. Is genetically modified Islam (GMI) carcinogenic?" in The Muslim World, 101/2, April 2011, pp. 130–181.
 Michot, Yahya. "From al-Ma'mūn to Ibn Sab'īn, via Avicenna: Ibn Taymiyya's Historiography of Falsafa", in F. OPWIS & D. REISMAN (eds.), Islamic Philosophy, Science, Culture, and Religion. Studies in Honor of Dimitri Gutas (Leiden – Boston: Brill, 2012), pp. 453–475.
 Michot, Yahya. "Between Entertainment and Religion: Ibn Taymiyya's Views on Superstition", in The Muslim World, 99/1, January 2009, pp. 1–20.
 Michot, Yahya. "Misled and Misleading… Yet Central in their Influence: Ibn Taymiyya's Views on the Ikhwān al-Safā, in The Ikhwān al-Safā' and their Rasā'il. An Introduction. Edited by Nader EL-BIZRI. Foreword by Farhad DAFTARY (Oxford: Oxford University Press, in association with the Institute of Ismaili Studies, Epistles of the Brethren of Purity), 2008, pp. 139–179.
 Michot, Yahya. "Ibn Taymiyya's Commentary on the Creed of al-Hallâj", in A. SHIHADEH (ed.), Sufism and Theology (Edinburgh, Edinburgh University Press, 2007), pp. 123–136.
 Michot, Yahya. "A Mamlûk Theologian's Commentary on Avicenna's Risāla Aḍḥawiyya. Being a Translation of a Part of the Dar' al-Ta'āruḍ of Ibn Taymiyya, with Introduction, Annotation, and Appendices, Part I", in Journal of Islamic Studies, 14:2, Oxford, 2003, pp. 149–203.
 Michot, Yahya. "A Mamlûk Theologian's Commentary on Avicenna's Risāla Aḍḥawiyya. Being a Translation of a Part of the Dar' al-Ta'āruḍ of Ibn Taymiyya, with Introduction, Annotation, and Appendices, Part II", in Journal of Islamic Studies, 14:3, Oxford, 2003, pp. 309–363.
 Michot, Yahya. "Ibn Taymiyya on Astrology. Annotated Translation of Three Fatwas", in Journal of Islamic Studies, 11/2, Oxford, May 2000, pp. 147–208.
 Michot, Yahya. "Ibn Taymiyya's Critique of Shī'ī Imāmology. Translation of Three Sections of his Minhāj al-Sunna", in The Muslim World, 104/1–2, Hartford, Jan–April 2014, pp. 109–149.
 Michot, Yahya. "An Important Reader of al-Ghazālī: Ibn Taymiyya", in The Muslim World, 103/1, Hartford, January 2013, pp. 131–160.

External links 

1263 births
1328 deaths
13th-century Arabs
14th-century Arabs
14th-century Muslim theologians
13th-century Muslim theologians
Atharis
Critics of Shia Islam
Critics of atheism
Critics of Christianity
Hanbalis
Shaykh al-Islāms
Offensive jihad
People who died in prison custody
Economists of the medieval Islamic world
Salafis
Sunni fiqh scholars
Sunni imams
Biographical evaluation scholars
Proto-Salafists
Ibn Taymiyyah family
Anti-Shi'ism
Theologians from the Mamluk Sultanate
Critics of Ibn Arabi
People from Harran
Prisoners and detainees of the Mamluk Sultanate